

596001–596100 

|-bgcolor=#fefefe
| 596001 ||  || — || October 7, 2004 || Kitt Peak || Spacewatch ||  || align=right data-sort-value="0.76" | 760 m || 
|-id=002 bgcolor=#d6d6d6
| 596002 ||  || — || October 7, 2004 || Kitt Peak || Spacewatch ||  || align=right | 3.1 km || 
|-id=003 bgcolor=#d6d6d6
| 596003 ||  || — || October 8, 2004 || Kitt Peak || Spacewatch ||  || align=right | 2.0 km || 
|-id=004 bgcolor=#E9E9E9
| 596004 ||  || — || October 8, 2004 || Kitt Peak || Spacewatch ||  || align=right | 2.0 km || 
|-id=005 bgcolor=#d6d6d6
| 596005 ||  || — || October 8, 2004 || Kitt Peak || Spacewatch ||  || align=right | 2.2 km || 
|-id=006 bgcolor=#d6d6d6
| 596006 ||  || — || October 7, 2004 || Kitt Peak || Spacewatch ||  || align=right | 1.8 km || 
|-id=007 bgcolor=#d6d6d6
| 596007 ||  || — || October 9, 2004 || Kitt Peak || Spacewatch ||  || align=right | 1.9 km || 
|-id=008 bgcolor=#d6d6d6
| 596008 ||  || — || October 9, 2004 || Kitt Peak || Spacewatch ||  || align=right | 2.4 km || 
|-id=009 bgcolor=#d6d6d6
| 596009 ||  || — || October 9, 2004 || Kitt Peak || Spacewatch ||  || align=right | 2.4 km || 
|-id=010 bgcolor=#E9E9E9
| 596010 ||  || — || October 8, 2004 || Kitt Peak || Spacewatch ||  || align=right | 1.3 km || 
|-id=011 bgcolor=#d6d6d6
| 596011 ||  || — || October 10, 2004 || Kitt Peak || Spacewatch ||  || align=right | 2.8 km || 
|-id=012 bgcolor=#d6d6d6
| 596012 ||  || — || October 10, 2004 || Kitt Peak || Spacewatch ||  || align=right | 2.7 km || 
|-id=013 bgcolor=#E9E9E9
| 596013 ||  || — || October 10, 2004 || Socorro || LINEAR ||  || align=right data-sort-value="0.84" | 840 m || 
|-id=014 bgcolor=#d6d6d6
| 596014 ||  || — || October 11, 2004 || Kitt Peak || Spacewatch ||  || align=right | 2.5 km || 
|-id=015 bgcolor=#d6d6d6
| 596015 ||  || — || October 11, 2004 || Kitt Peak || Spacewatch ||  || align=right | 2.6 km || 
|-id=016 bgcolor=#E9E9E9
| 596016 ||  || — || September 23, 2004 || Kitt Peak || Spacewatch ||  || align=right data-sort-value="0.98" | 980 m || 
|-id=017 bgcolor=#E9E9E9
| 596017 ||  || — || October 11, 2004 || Kitt Peak || Spacewatch ||  || align=right data-sort-value="0.66" | 660 m || 
|-id=018 bgcolor=#E9E9E9
| 596018 ||  || — || October 11, 2004 || Kitt Peak || Spacewatch ||  || align=right | 1.6 km || 
|-id=019 bgcolor=#d6d6d6
| 596019 ||  || — || October 11, 2004 || Kitt Peak || Spacewatch ||  || align=right | 2.4 km || 
|-id=020 bgcolor=#E9E9E9
| 596020 ||  || — || October 9, 2004 || Kitt Peak || Spacewatch ||  || align=right | 1.7 km || 
|-id=021 bgcolor=#d6d6d6
| 596021 ||  || — || October 9, 2004 || Kitt Peak || Spacewatch ||  || align=right | 2.2 km || 
|-id=022 bgcolor=#d6d6d6
| 596022 ||  || — || October 9, 2004 || Kitt Peak || Spacewatch ||  || align=right | 2.2 km || 
|-id=023 bgcolor=#d6d6d6
| 596023 ||  || — || October 10, 2004 || Kitt Peak || Spacewatch ||  || align=right | 3.0 km || 
|-id=024 bgcolor=#d6d6d6
| 596024 ||  || — || October 15, 2004 || Kitt Peak || Spacewatch ||  || align=right | 2.2 km || 
|-id=025 bgcolor=#fefefe
| 596025 ||  || — || October 15, 2004 || Mount Lemmon || Mount Lemmon Survey ||  || align=right data-sort-value="0.86" | 860 m || 
|-id=026 bgcolor=#fefefe
| 596026 ||  || — || October 11, 2004 || Kitt Peak || L. H. Wasserman, J. R. Lovering ||  || align=right data-sort-value="0.52" | 520 m || 
|-id=027 bgcolor=#d6d6d6
| 596027 ||  || — || September 11, 2004 || Kitt Peak || Spacewatch ||  || align=right | 2.2 km || 
|-id=028 bgcolor=#E9E9E9
| 596028 ||  || — || October 7, 2004 || Anderson Mesa || LONEOS ||  || align=right | 2.0 km || 
|-id=029 bgcolor=#fefefe
| 596029 ||  || — || January 24, 2012 || Haleakala || Pan-STARRS ||  || align=right data-sort-value="0.76" | 760 m || 
|-id=030 bgcolor=#E9E9E9
| 596030 ||  || — || August 8, 2008 || Siding Spring || SSS ||  || align=right | 1.3 km || 
|-id=031 bgcolor=#d6d6d6
| 596031 ||  || — || October 8, 2004 || Kitt Peak || Spacewatch ||  || align=right | 2.5 km || 
|-id=032 bgcolor=#E9E9E9
| 596032 ||  || — || September 4, 2008 || Kitt Peak || Spacewatch ||  || align=right data-sort-value="0.81" | 810 m || 
|-id=033 bgcolor=#fefefe
| 596033 ||  || — || October 23, 2011 || Taunus || E. Schwab, R. Kling ||  || align=right data-sort-value="0.55" | 550 m || 
|-id=034 bgcolor=#E9E9E9
| 596034 ||  || — || October 13, 2004 || Kitt Peak || Spacewatch ||  || align=right | 1.2 km || 
|-id=035 bgcolor=#d6d6d6
| 596035 ||  || — || February 17, 2013 || Kitt Peak || Spacewatch ||  || align=right | 2.9 km || 
|-id=036 bgcolor=#d6d6d6
| 596036 ||  || — || April 6, 2013 || Mount Lemmon || Mount Lemmon Survey ||  || align=right | 2.4 km || 
|-id=037 bgcolor=#d6d6d6
| 596037 ||  || — || October 14, 2004 || Kitt Peak || Spacewatch ||  || align=right | 2.5 km || 
|-id=038 bgcolor=#fefefe
| 596038 ||  || — || October 14, 2004 || Kitt Peak || Spacewatch ||  || align=right data-sort-value="0.48" | 480 m || 
|-id=039 bgcolor=#E9E9E9
| 596039 ||  || — || October 18, 2004 || Socorro || LINEAR ||  || align=right data-sort-value="0.91" | 910 m || 
|-id=040 bgcolor=#E9E9E9
| 596040 ||  || — || November 3, 2004 || Kitt Peak || Spacewatch ||  || align=right | 1.1 km || 
|-id=041 bgcolor=#d6d6d6
| 596041 ||  || — || November 3, 2004 || Kitt Peak || Spacewatch ||  || align=right | 1.8 km || 
|-id=042 bgcolor=#E9E9E9
| 596042 ||  || — || November 7, 2004 || Socorro || LINEAR ||  || align=right | 1.0 km || 
|-id=043 bgcolor=#fefefe
| 596043 ||  || — || November 7, 2004 || Socorro || LINEAR ||  || align=right data-sort-value="0.69" | 690 m || 
|-id=044 bgcolor=#E9E9E9
| 596044 ||  || — || November 4, 2004 || Kitt Peak || Spacewatch ||  || align=right | 1.4 km || 
|-id=045 bgcolor=#d6d6d6
| 596045 ||  || — || November 9, 2004 || Catalina || CSS ||  || align=right | 3.2 km || 
|-id=046 bgcolor=#E9E9E9
| 596046 ||  || — || October 14, 2004 || Kitt Peak || Spacewatch ||  || align=right | 2.6 km || 
|-id=047 bgcolor=#fefefe
| 596047 ||  || — || October 15, 2004 || Kitt Peak || Spacewatch ||  || align=right data-sort-value="0.69" | 690 m || 
|-id=048 bgcolor=#d6d6d6
| 596048 ||  || — || November 11, 2004 || Kitt Peak || Kitt Peak Obs. ||  || align=right | 2.4 km || 
|-id=049 bgcolor=#d6d6d6
| 596049 ||  || — || October 15, 2004 || Mount Lemmon || Mount Lemmon Survey ||  || align=right | 2.4 km || 
|-id=050 bgcolor=#d6d6d6
| 596050 ||  || — || November 9, 2004 || Mauna Kea || Mauna Kea Obs. ||  || align=right | 3.3 km || 
|-id=051 bgcolor=#d6d6d6
| 596051 ||  || — || October 10, 2004 || Kitt Peak || Spacewatch ||  || align=right | 1.9 km || 
|-id=052 bgcolor=#d6d6d6
| 596052 ||  || — || April 15, 2008 || Mount Lemmon || Mount Lemmon Survey ||  || align=right | 1.9 km || 
|-id=053 bgcolor=#E9E9E9
| 596053 ||  || — || June 12, 2007 || Catalina || CSS ||  || align=right | 1.7 km || 
|-id=054 bgcolor=#E9E9E9
| 596054 ||  || — || April 12, 2011 || Mount Lemmon || Mount Lemmon Survey ||  || align=right | 1.5 km || 
|-id=055 bgcolor=#d6d6d6
| 596055 ||  || — || July 25, 2015 || Haleakala || Pan-STARRS ||  || align=right | 3.4 km || 
|-id=056 bgcolor=#d6d6d6
| 596056 ||  || — || June 2, 2014 || Haleakala || Pan-STARRS ||  || align=right | 2.6 km || 
|-id=057 bgcolor=#E9E9E9
| 596057 ||  || — || November 4, 2004 || Catalina || CSS ||  || align=right data-sort-value="0.71" | 710 m || 
|-id=058 bgcolor=#d6d6d6
| 596058 ||  || — || November 4, 2004 || Catalina || CSS ||  || align=right | 3.5 km || 
|-id=059 bgcolor=#E9E9E9
| 596059 ||  || — || December 10, 2004 || Socorro || LINEAR ||  || align=right | 1.2 km || 
|-id=060 bgcolor=#E9E9E9
| 596060 ||  || — || December 9, 2004 || Kitt Peak || Spacewatch ||  || align=right | 1.8 km || 
|-id=061 bgcolor=#d6d6d6
| 596061 ||  || — || November 4, 2004 || Kitt Peak || Spacewatch ||  || align=right | 3.7 km || 
|-id=062 bgcolor=#E9E9E9
| 596062 ||  || — || December 10, 2004 || Kitt Peak || Spacewatch ||  || align=right | 2.0 km || 
|-id=063 bgcolor=#d6d6d6
| 596063 ||  || — || December 7, 2004 || Socorro || LINEAR ||  || align=right | 3.8 km || 
|-id=064 bgcolor=#d6d6d6
| 596064 ||  || — || November 20, 2004 || Kitt Peak || Spacewatch ||  || align=right | 2.8 km || 
|-id=065 bgcolor=#E9E9E9
| 596065 ||  || — || December 10, 2004 || Kitt Peak || Spacewatch ||  || align=right | 2.5 km || 
|-id=066 bgcolor=#E9E9E9
| 596066 ||  || — || December 10, 2004 || Kitt Peak || Spacewatch ||  || align=right | 1.2 km || 
|-id=067 bgcolor=#E9E9E9
| 596067 ||  || — || December 9, 2004 || Kitt Peak || Spacewatch ||  || align=right | 1.2 km || 
|-id=068 bgcolor=#d6d6d6
| 596068 ||  || — || December 10, 2004 || Kitt Peak || Spacewatch ||  || align=right | 3.0 km || 
|-id=069 bgcolor=#fefefe
| 596069 ||  || — || December 11, 2004 || Kitt Peak || Spacewatch ||  || align=right data-sort-value="0.82" | 820 m || 
|-id=070 bgcolor=#E9E9E9
| 596070 ||  || — || December 14, 2004 || Kitt Peak || Spacewatch ||  || align=right | 2.2 km || 
|-id=071 bgcolor=#E9E9E9
| 596071 ||  || — || April 23, 2015 || Haleakala || Pan-STARRS ||  || align=right | 1.1 km || 
|-id=072 bgcolor=#d6d6d6
| 596072 ||  || — || May 13, 2007 || Kitt Peak || Spacewatch ||  || align=right | 2.8 km || 
|-id=073 bgcolor=#E9E9E9
| 596073 ||  || — || September 25, 2008 || Kitt Peak || Spacewatch ||  || align=right | 1.1 km || 
|-id=074 bgcolor=#d6d6d6
| 596074 ||  || — || September 28, 2009 || Catalina || CSS ||  || align=right | 2.5 km || 
|-id=075 bgcolor=#E9E9E9
| 596075 ||  || — || December 20, 2004 || Bergisch Gladbach || W. Bickel ||  || align=right | 2.0 km || 
|-id=076 bgcolor=#E9E9E9
| 596076 ||  || — || December 19, 2004 || Mount Lemmon || Mount Lemmon Survey ||  || align=right | 1.6 km || 
|-id=077 bgcolor=#d6d6d6
| 596077 ||  || — || December 19, 2004 || Mount Lemmon || Mount Lemmon Survey ||  || align=right | 2.4 km || 
|-id=078 bgcolor=#E9E9E9
| 596078 ||  || — || December 31, 2000 || Kitt Peak || Spacewatch ||  || align=right | 1.5 km || 
|-id=079 bgcolor=#C2FFFF
| 596079 ||  || — || November 14, 2002 || Palomar || NEAT || L5 || align=right | 14 km || 
|-id=080 bgcolor=#E9E9E9
| 596080 ||  || — || January 15, 2005 || Socorro || LINEAR ||  || align=right | 1.7 km || 
|-id=081 bgcolor=#E9E9E9
| 596081 ||  || — || January 13, 2005 || Kitt Peak || Spacewatch ||  || align=right | 1.2 km || 
|-id=082 bgcolor=#d6d6d6
| 596082 ||  || — || August 27, 2003 || Palomar || NEAT || Tj (2.99) || align=right | 4.9 km || 
|-id=083 bgcolor=#fefefe
| 596083 ||  || — || January 13, 2005 || Kitt Peak || Spacewatch ||  || align=right data-sort-value="0.58" | 580 m || 
|-id=084 bgcolor=#E9E9E9
| 596084 ||  || — || January 13, 2005 || Kitt Peak || Spacewatch ||  || align=right | 1.7 km || 
|-id=085 bgcolor=#C2FFFF
| 596085 ||  || — || January 15, 2005 || Kitt Peak || Spacewatch || L5 || align=right | 13 km || 
|-id=086 bgcolor=#E9E9E9
| 596086 ||  || — || January 15, 2005 || Kitt Peak || Spacewatch ||  || align=right | 1.3 km || 
|-id=087 bgcolor=#d6d6d6
| 596087 ||  || — || January 15, 2005 || Kitt Peak || Spacewatch ||  || align=right | 2.7 km || 
|-id=088 bgcolor=#fefefe
| 596088 ||  || — || March 31, 2009 || Kitt Peak || Spacewatch ||  || align=right data-sort-value="0.72" | 720 m || 
|-id=089 bgcolor=#d6d6d6
| 596089 ||  || — || August 24, 2008 || Kitt Peak || Spacewatch ||  || align=right | 3.0 km || 
|-id=090 bgcolor=#fefefe
| 596090 ||  || — || October 20, 2007 || Mount Lemmon || Mount Lemmon Survey ||  || align=right data-sort-value="0.59" | 590 m || 
|-id=091 bgcolor=#fefefe
| 596091 ||  || — || October 9, 2007 || Mount Lemmon || Mount Lemmon Survey ||  || align=right data-sort-value="0.58" | 580 m || 
|-id=092 bgcolor=#E9E9E9
| 596092 ||  || — || January 15, 2005 || Kitt Peak || Spacewatch ||  || align=right | 1.4 km || 
|-id=093 bgcolor=#d6d6d6
| 596093 ||  || — || January 8, 2005 || Vallemare Borbona || V. S. Casulli ||  || align=right | 3.6 km || 
|-id=094 bgcolor=#E9E9E9
| 596094 ||  || — || January 20, 2005 || Wrightwood || J. W. Young ||  || align=right | 1.2 km || 
|-id=095 bgcolor=#E9E9E9
| 596095 ||  || — || January 16, 2005 || Kitt Peak || Spacewatch ||  || align=right | 1.7 km || 
|-id=096 bgcolor=#fefefe
| 596096 ||  || — || January 19, 2005 || Kitt Peak || Spacewatch || H || align=right data-sort-value="0.60" | 600 m || 
|-id=097 bgcolor=#E9E9E9
| 596097 ||  || — || January 16, 2005 || Mauna Kea || Mauna Kea Obs. ||  || align=right | 2.1 km || 
|-id=098 bgcolor=#fefefe
| 596098 ||  || — || January 16, 2005 || Mauna Kea || Mauna Kea Obs. ||  || align=right data-sort-value="0.58" | 580 m || 
|-id=099 bgcolor=#E9E9E9
| 596099 ||  || — || January 16, 2005 || Mauna Kea || Mauna Kea Obs. ||  || align=right | 1.3 km || 
|-id=100 bgcolor=#E9E9E9
| 596100 ||  || — || January 16, 2005 || Mauna Kea || Mauna Kea Obs. ||  || align=right | 2.0 km || 
|}

596101–596200 

|-bgcolor=#fefefe
| 596101 ||  || — || January 16, 2005 || Mauna Kea || Mauna Kea Obs. ||  || align=right data-sort-value="0.57" | 570 m || 
|-id=102 bgcolor=#fefefe
| 596102 ||  || — || January 16, 2005 || Mauna Kea || Mauna Kea Obs. ||  || align=right data-sort-value="0.44" | 440 m || 
|-id=103 bgcolor=#d6d6d6
| 596103 ||  || — || November 15, 2003 || Kitt Peak || Spacewatch ||  || align=right | 2.4 km || 
|-id=104 bgcolor=#fefefe
| 596104 ||  || — || January 20, 2012 || Kitt Peak || Spacewatch ||  || align=right | 1.1 km || 
|-id=105 bgcolor=#fefefe
| 596105 ||  || — || December 31, 2011 || Kitt Peak || Spacewatch ||  || align=right data-sort-value="0.62" | 620 m || 
|-id=106 bgcolor=#fefefe
| 596106 ||  || — || February 25, 2012 || Kitt Peak || Spacewatch ||  || align=right data-sort-value="0.68" | 680 m || 
|-id=107 bgcolor=#fefefe
| 596107 ||  || — || February 24, 2012 || Kitt Peak || Spacewatch ||  || align=right data-sort-value="0.59" | 590 m || 
|-id=108 bgcolor=#fefefe
| 596108 ||  || — || January 17, 2005 || Kitt Peak || Spacewatch ||  || align=right data-sort-value="0.63" | 630 m || 
|-id=109 bgcolor=#d6d6d6
| 596109 ||  || — || February 1, 2005 || Palomar || NEAT ||  || align=right | 3.0 km || 
|-id=110 bgcolor=#E9E9E9
| 596110 ||  || — || December 20, 2004 || Mount Lemmon || Mount Lemmon Survey ||  || align=right | 2.1 km || 
|-id=111 bgcolor=#E9E9E9
| 596111 ||  || — || February 2, 2005 || Catalina || CSS ||  || align=right | 1.3 km || 
|-id=112 bgcolor=#fefefe
| 596112 ||  || — || February 9, 2005 || Mount Lemmon || Mount Lemmon Survey ||  || align=right data-sort-value="0.63" | 630 m || 
|-id=113 bgcolor=#fefefe
| 596113 ||  || — || February 4, 2005 || Kitt Peak || Spacewatch ||  || align=right data-sort-value="0.76" | 760 m || 
|-id=114 bgcolor=#d6d6d6
| 596114 ||  || — || December 14, 2010 || Kitt Peak || Spacewatch ||  || align=right | 3.2 km || 
|-id=115 bgcolor=#fefefe
| 596115 ||  || — || February 2, 2005 || Kitt Peak || Spacewatch || H || align=right data-sort-value="0.58" | 580 m || 
|-id=116 bgcolor=#E9E9E9
| 596116 ||  || — || April 25, 2015 || Haleakala || Pan-STARRS ||  || align=right | 1.4 km || 
|-id=117 bgcolor=#fefefe
| 596117 ||  || — || February 3, 2012 || Haleakala || Pan-STARRS ||  || align=right data-sort-value="0.66" | 660 m || 
|-id=118 bgcolor=#fefefe
| 596118 ||  || — || April 18, 2009 || Mount Lemmon || Mount Lemmon Survey ||  || align=right data-sort-value="0.57" | 570 m || 
|-id=119 bgcolor=#E9E9E9
| 596119 ||  || — || February 13, 2005 || La Silla || A. Boattini ||  || align=right | 1.5 km || 
|-id=120 bgcolor=#E9E9E9
| 596120 ||  || — || September 23, 2008 || Mount Lemmon || Mount Lemmon Survey ||  || align=right | 1.4 km || 
|-id=121 bgcolor=#E9E9E9
| 596121 ||  || — || October 22, 2012 || Haleakala || Pan-STARRS ||  || align=right | 1.9 km || 
|-id=122 bgcolor=#fefefe
| 596122 ||  || — || March 31, 2009 || Mount Lemmon || Mount Lemmon Survey ||  || align=right data-sort-value="0.64" | 640 m || 
|-id=123 bgcolor=#fefefe
| 596123 ||  || — || March 28, 2009 || Kitt Peak || Spacewatch ||  || align=right data-sort-value="0.54" | 540 m || 
|-id=124 bgcolor=#d6d6d6
| 596124 ||  || — || February 16, 2005 || La Silla || A. Boattini ||  || align=right | 1.9 km || 
|-id=125 bgcolor=#E9E9E9
| 596125 ||  || — || February 18, 2005 || La Silla || A. Boattini ||  || align=right | 1.4 km || 
|-id=126 bgcolor=#E9E9E9
| 596126 ||  || — || March 2, 2005 || Mayhill || A. Lowe ||  || align=right | 1.6 km || 
|-id=127 bgcolor=#E9E9E9
| 596127 ||  || — || March 3, 2005 || Kitt Peak || Spacewatch ||  || align=right | 1.7 km || 
|-id=128 bgcolor=#E9E9E9
| 596128 ||  || — || March 3, 2005 || Kitt Peak || Spacewatch ||  || align=right | 2.0 km || 
|-id=129 bgcolor=#E9E9E9
| 596129 ||  || — || March 3, 2005 || Kitt Peak || Spacewatch ||  || align=right | 1.3 km || 
|-id=130 bgcolor=#fefefe
| 596130 ||  || — || March 3, 2005 || Kitt Peak || Spacewatch ||  || align=right data-sort-value="0.55" | 550 m || 
|-id=131 bgcolor=#E9E9E9
| 596131 ||  || — || March 3, 2005 || Catalina || CSS ||  || align=right | 1.4 km || 
|-id=132 bgcolor=#fefefe
| 596132 ||  || — || March 3, 2005 || Vail-Jarnac || Jarnac Obs. ||  || align=right data-sort-value="0.73" | 730 m || 
|-id=133 bgcolor=#E9E9E9
| 596133 ||  || — || February 9, 2005 || Kitt Peak || Spacewatch ||  || align=right | 2.1 km || 
|-id=134 bgcolor=#fefefe
| 596134 ||  || — || September 18, 1995 || Kitt Peak || Spacewatch ||  || align=right data-sort-value="0.63" | 630 m || 
|-id=135 bgcolor=#fefefe
| 596135 ||  || — || March 4, 2005 || Kitt Peak || Spacewatch ||  || align=right data-sort-value="0.59" | 590 m || 
|-id=136 bgcolor=#E9E9E9
| 596136 ||  || — || March 4, 2005 || Catalina || CSS ||  || align=right | 1.8 km || 
|-id=137 bgcolor=#fefefe
| 596137 ||  || — || March 9, 2005 || Mount Lemmon || Mount Lemmon Survey ||  || align=right data-sort-value="0.58" | 580 m || 
|-id=138 bgcolor=#fefefe
| 596138 ||  || — || February 4, 2005 || Kitt Peak || Spacewatch ||  || align=right data-sort-value="0.50" | 500 m || 
|-id=139 bgcolor=#fefefe
| 596139 ||  || — || March 9, 2005 || Mount Lemmon || Mount Lemmon Survey ||  || align=right data-sort-value="0.58" | 580 m || 
|-id=140 bgcolor=#E9E9E9
| 596140 ||  || — || March 10, 2005 || Mount Lemmon || Mount Lemmon Survey ||  || align=right | 1.5 km || 
|-id=141 bgcolor=#E9E9E9
| 596141 ||  || — || March 8, 2005 || Kitt Peak || Spacewatch ||  || align=right | 1.0 km || 
|-id=142 bgcolor=#E9E9E9
| 596142 ||  || — || March 11, 2005 || Mount Lemmon || Mount Lemmon Survey ||  || align=right | 1.6 km || 
|-id=143 bgcolor=#fefefe
| 596143 ||  || — || March 11, 2005 || Mount Lemmon || Mount Lemmon Survey ||  || align=right data-sort-value="0.63" | 630 m || 
|-id=144 bgcolor=#E9E9E9
| 596144 ||  || — || March 4, 2005 || Kitt Peak || Spacewatch ||  || align=right | 1.8 km || 
|-id=145 bgcolor=#fefefe
| 596145 ||  || — || March 4, 2005 || Catalina || CSS ||  || align=right data-sort-value="0.68" | 680 m || 
|-id=146 bgcolor=#d6d6d6
| 596146 ||  || — || March 10, 2005 || Mount Lemmon || Mount Lemmon Survey ||  || align=right | 1.7 km || 
|-id=147 bgcolor=#fefefe
| 596147 ||  || — || September 20, 1995 || Kitt Peak || Spacewatch ||  || align=right data-sort-value="0.59" | 590 m || 
|-id=148 bgcolor=#fefefe
| 596148 ||  || — || March 10, 2005 || Mount Lemmon || Mount Lemmon Survey ||  || align=right data-sort-value="0.52" | 520 m || 
|-id=149 bgcolor=#fefefe
| 596149 ||  || — || March 11, 2005 || Mount Lemmon || Mount Lemmon Survey ||  || align=right data-sort-value="0.75" | 750 m || 
|-id=150 bgcolor=#d6d6d6
| 596150 ||  || — || March 13, 2005 || Kitt Peak || Spacewatch ||  || align=right | 3.6 km || 
|-id=151 bgcolor=#E9E9E9
| 596151 ||  || — || March 3, 2005 || Kitt Peak || Spacewatch ||  || align=right | 1.7 km || 
|-id=152 bgcolor=#d6d6d6
| 596152 ||  || — || February 9, 2005 || Mount Lemmon || Mount Lemmon Survey ||  || align=right | 2.8 km || 
|-id=153 bgcolor=#fefefe
| 596153 ||  || — || October 21, 2003 || Kitt Peak || Spacewatch ||  || align=right data-sort-value="0.53" | 530 m || 
|-id=154 bgcolor=#E9E9E9
| 596154 ||  || — || March 4, 2005 || Mount Lemmon || Mount Lemmon Survey ||  || align=right | 1.8 km || 
|-id=155 bgcolor=#E9E9E9
| 596155 ||  || — || March 8, 2005 || Mount Lemmon || Mount Lemmon Survey ||  || align=right | 1.6 km || 
|-id=156 bgcolor=#E9E9E9
| 596156 ||  || — || March 8, 2005 || Mount Lemmon || Mount Lemmon Survey ||  || align=right | 1.9 km || 
|-id=157 bgcolor=#E9E9E9
| 596157 ||  || — || March 9, 2005 || Mount Lemmon || Mount Lemmon Survey ||  || align=right | 1.4 km || 
|-id=158 bgcolor=#E9E9E9
| 596158 ||  || — || March 4, 2005 || Mount Lemmon || Mount Lemmon Survey ||  || align=right | 2.1 km || 
|-id=159 bgcolor=#fefefe
| 596159 ||  || — || April 22, 2009 || Mount Lemmon || Mount Lemmon Survey ||  || align=right data-sort-value="0.51" | 510 m || 
|-id=160 bgcolor=#fefefe
| 596160 ||  || — || March 10, 2005 || Mount Lemmon || Mount Lemmon Survey ||  || align=right data-sort-value="0.61" | 610 m || 
|-id=161 bgcolor=#fefefe
| 596161 ||  || — || March 8, 2005 || Mount Lemmon || Mount Lemmon Survey ||  || align=right data-sort-value="0.55" | 550 m || 
|-id=162 bgcolor=#E9E9E9
| 596162 ||  || — || March 9, 2005 || Kitt Peak || Spacewatch ||  || align=right | 1.8 km || 
|-id=163 bgcolor=#fefefe
| 596163 ||  || — || January 27, 2012 || Mount Lemmon || Mount Lemmon Survey ||  || align=right data-sort-value="0.61" | 610 m || 
|-id=164 bgcolor=#fefefe
| 596164 ||  || — || April 27, 2009 || Mount Lemmon || Mount Lemmon Survey ||  || align=right data-sort-value="0.73" | 730 m || 
|-id=165 bgcolor=#E9E9E9
| 596165 ||  || — || August 27, 2011 || Haleakala || Pan-STARRS ||  || align=right | 1.7 km || 
|-id=166 bgcolor=#fefefe
| 596166 ||  || — || March 13, 2005 || Kitt Peak || Spacewatch ||  || align=right data-sort-value="0.58" | 580 m || 
|-id=167 bgcolor=#fefefe
| 596167 ||  || — || February 9, 2016 || Haleakala || Pan-STARRS ||  || align=right data-sort-value="0.56" | 560 m || 
|-id=168 bgcolor=#fefefe
| 596168 ||  || — || March 13, 2012 || Kitt Peak || Spacewatch ||  || align=right data-sort-value="0.63" | 630 m || 
|-id=169 bgcolor=#E9E9E9
| 596169 ||  || — || March 12, 2005 || Kitt Peak || Spacewatch ||  || align=right | 2.2 km || 
|-id=170 bgcolor=#fefefe
| 596170 ||  || — || December 26, 2017 || Mount Lemmon || Mount Lemmon Survey || H || align=right data-sort-value="0.56" | 560 m || 
|-id=171 bgcolor=#fefefe
| 596171 ||  || — || July 21, 2006 || Lulin || LUSS ||  || align=right data-sort-value="0.64" | 640 m || 
|-id=172 bgcolor=#E9E9E9
| 596172 ||  || — || March 11, 2005 || Mount Lemmon || Mount Lemmon Survey ||  || align=right | 1.8 km || 
|-id=173 bgcolor=#E9E9E9
| 596173 ||  || — || March 13, 2005 || Kitt Peak || Spacewatch ||  || align=right | 1.1 km || 
|-id=174 bgcolor=#E9E9E9
| 596174 ||  || — || June 17, 2015 || Haleakala || Pan-STARRS ||  || align=right | 1.4 km || 
|-id=175 bgcolor=#E9E9E9
| 596175 ||  || — || February 26, 2014 || Haleakala || Pan-STARRS ||  || align=right | 1.9 km || 
|-id=176 bgcolor=#fefefe
| 596176 ||  || — || March 3, 2005 || Kitt Peak || Spacewatch ||  || align=right data-sort-value="0.50" | 500 m || 
|-id=177 bgcolor=#d6d6d6
| 596177 ||  || — || August 14, 2013 || Haleakala || Pan-STARRS ||  || align=right | 2.8 km || 
|-id=178 bgcolor=#E9E9E9
| 596178 ||  || — || January 25, 2009 || Kitt Peak || Spacewatch ||  || align=right | 2.0 km || 
|-id=179 bgcolor=#fefefe
| 596179 ||  || — || March 17, 2005 || Kitt Peak || Spacewatch ||  || align=right data-sort-value="0.57" | 570 m || 
|-id=180 bgcolor=#fefefe
| 596180 ||  || — || June 12, 2015 || Mount Lemmon || Mount Lemmon Survey ||  || align=right data-sort-value="0.56" | 560 m || 
|-id=181 bgcolor=#d6d6d6
| 596181 ||  || — || September 26, 2008 || Kitt Peak || Spacewatch ||  || align=right | 2.0 km || 
|-id=182 bgcolor=#fefefe
| 596182 ||  || — || February 27, 2012 || Haleakala || Pan-STARRS ||  || align=right data-sort-value="0.50" | 500 m || 
|-id=183 bgcolor=#fefefe
| 596183 ||  || — || April 1, 2005 || Kitt Peak || Spacewatch ||  || align=right data-sort-value="0.83" | 830 m || 
|-id=184 bgcolor=#fefefe
| 596184 ||  || — || April 1, 2005 || Kitt Peak || Spacewatch ||  || align=right data-sort-value="0.77" | 770 m || 
|-id=185 bgcolor=#fefefe
| 596185 ||  || — || March 17, 2005 || Kitt Peak || Spacewatch ||  || align=right data-sort-value="0.63" | 630 m || 
|-id=186 bgcolor=#E9E9E9
| 596186 ||  || — || March 10, 2005 || Mount Lemmon || Mount Lemmon Survey ||  || align=right | 2.0 km || 
|-id=187 bgcolor=#fefefe
| 596187 ||  || — || April 2, 2005 || Mount Lemmon || Mount Lemmon Survey ||  || align=right data-sort-value="0.52" | 520 m || 
|-id=188 bgcolor=#fefefe
| 596188 ||  || — || April 6, 2005 || Mount Lemmon || Mount Lemmon Survey || H || align=right data-sort-value="0.41" | 410 m || 
|-id=189 bgcolor=#fefefe
| 596189 ||  || — || April 9, 2005 || Mount Lemmon || Mount Lemmon Survey ||  || align=right data-sort-value="0.62" | 620 m || 
|-id=190 bgcolor=#d6d6d6
| 596190 ||  || — || April 10, 2005 || Mount Lemmon || Mount Lemmon Survey ||  || align=right | 2.2 km || 
|-id=191 bgcolor=#fefefe
| 596191 ||  || — || March 9, 2005 || Mount Lemmon || Mount Lemmon Survey ||  || align=right data-sort-value="0.71" | 710 m || 
|-id=192 bgcolor=#fefefe
| 596192 ||  || — || April 10, 2005 || Mount Lemmon || Mount Lemmon Survey ||  || align=right data-sort-value="0.59" | 590 m || 
|-id=193 bgcolor=#E9E9E9
| 596193 ||  || — || April 11, 2005 || Mount Lemmon || Mount Lemmon Survey ||  || align=right | 1.5 km || 
|-id=194 bgcolor=#E9E9E9
| 596194 ||  || — || April 7, 2005 || Kitt Peak || Spacewatch ||  || align=right | 2.1 km || 
|-id=195 bgcolor=#E9E9E9
| 596195 ||  || — || March 14, 2005 || Mount Lemmon || Mount Lemmon Survey ||  || align=right | 2.1 km || 
|-id=196 bgcolor=#fefefe
| 596196 ||  || — || April 11, 2005 || Kitt Peak || Spacewatch ||  || align=right data-sort-value="0.58" | 580 m || 
|-id=197 bgcolor=#d6d6d6
| 596197 ||  || — || April 12, 2005 || Kitt Peak || Spacewatch || 3:2 || align=right | 3.7 km || 
|-id=198 bgcolor=#E9E9E9
| 596198 ||  || — || April 12, 2005 || Kitt Peak || Spacewatch ||  || align=right | 2.5 km || 
|-id=199 bgcolor=#E9E9E9
| 596199 ||  || — || April 4, 2005 || Kitt Peak || Spacewatch ||  || align=right | 2.8 km || 
|-id=200 bgcolor=#fefefe
| 596200 ||  || — || April 1, 2005 || Kitt Peak || Spacewatch ||  || align=right data-sort-value="0.63" | 630 m || 
|}

596201–596300 

|-bgcolor=#fefefe
| 596201 ||  || — || April 10, 2005 || Kitt Peak || Kitt Peak Obs. ||  || align=right data-sort-value="0.53" | 530 m || 
|-id=202 bgcolor=#fefefe
| 596202 ||  || — || October 12, 1999 || Kitt Peak || Spacewatch ||  || align=right data-sort-value="0.63" | 630 m || 
|-id=203 bgcolor=#d6d6d6
| 596203 ||  || — || April 10, 2005 || Kitt Peak || Kitt Peak Obs. ||  || align=right | 2.2 km || 
|-id=204 bgcolor=#E9E9E9
| 596204 ||  || — || April 4, 2005 || Mount Lemmon || Mount Lemmon Survey ||  || align=right data-sort-value="0.72" | 720 m || 
|-id=205 bgcolor=#fefefe
| 596205 ||  || — || April 11, 2005 || Mount Lemmon || Mount Lemmon Survey ||  || align=right data-sort-value="0.56" | 560 m || 
|-id=206 bgcolor=#fefefe
| 596206 ||  || — || March 11, 2005 || Kitt Peak || Spacewatch ||  || align=right data-sort-value="0.84" | 840 m || 
|-id=207 bgcolor=#fefefe
| 596207 ||  || — || April 1, 2005 || Kitt Peak || Spacewatch ||  || align=right data-sort-value="0.64" | 640 m || 
|-id=208 bgcolor=#fefefe
| 596208 ||  || — || April 2, 2005 || Kitt Peak || Spacewatch ||  || align=right data-sort-value="0.56" | 560 m || 
|-id=209 bgcolor=#fefefe
| 596209 ||  || — || February 22, 2012 || Kitt Peak || Spacewatch ||  || align=right data-sort-value="0.55" | 550 m || 
|-id=210 bgcolor=#fefefe
| 596210 ||  || — || April 4, 2005 || Kitt Peak || Spacewatch ||  || align=right data-sort-value="0.71" | 710 m || 
|-id=211 bgcolor=#d6d6d6
| 596211 ||  || — || April 7, 2005 || Kitt Peak || Spacewatch ||  || align=right | 2.7 km || 
|-id=212 bgcolor=#E9E9E9
| 596212 ||  || — || January 31, 2014 || Haleakala || Pan-STARRS ||  || align=right | 1.9 km || 
|-id=213 bgcolor=#fefefe
| 596213 ||  || — || February 1, 2012 || Kitt Peak || Spacewatch ||  || align=right data-sort-value="0.67" | 670 m || 
|-id=214 bgcolor=#fefefe
| 596214 ||  || — || December 30, 2007 || Kitt Peak || Spacewatch ||  || align=right data-sort-value="0.68" | 680 m || 
|-id=215 bgcolor=#fefefe
| 596215 ||  || — || April 23, 2009 || Mount Lemmon || Mount Lemmon Survey ||  || align=right data-sort-value="0.64" | 640 m || 
|-id=216 bgcolor=#fefefe
| 596216 ||  || — || April 4, 2005 || Mount Lemmon || Mount Lemmon Survey ||  || align=right data-sort-value="0.50" | 500 m || 
|-id=217 bgcolor=#fefefe
| 596217 ||  || — || September 24, 2013 || Catalina || CSS ||  || align=right data-sort-value="0.79" | 790 m || 
|-id=218 bgcolor=#E9E9E9
| 596218 ||  || — || February 3, 2009 || Kitt Peak || Spacewatch ||  || align=right | 1.9 km || 
|-id=219 bgcolor=#E9E9E9
| 596219 ||  || — || February 28, 2014 || Haleakala || Pan-STARRS ||  || align=right | 1.5 km || 
|-id=220 bgcolor=#E9E9E9
| 596220 ||  || — || April 30, 2005 || Kitt Peak || Spacewatch ||  || align=right | 1.8 km || 
|-id=221 bgcolor=#E9E9E9
| 596221 ||  || — || April 4, 2005 || Mount Lemmon || Mount Lemmon Survey ||  || align=right | 2.1 km || 
|-id=222 bgcolor=#E9E9E9
| 596222 ||  || — || May 4, 2005 || Mauna Kea || Mauna Kea Obs. ||  || align=right | 1.6 km || 
|-id=223 bgcolor=#fefefe
| 596223 ||  || — || May 4, 2005 || Mauna Kea || Mauna Kea Obs. ||  || align=right data-sort-value="0.64" | 640 m || 
|-id=224 bgcolor=#d6d6d6
| 596224 ||  || — || May 4, 2005 || Mauna Kea || Mauna Kea Obs. ||  || align=right | 2.0 km || 
|-id=225 bgcolor=#d6d6d6
| 596225 ||  || — || May 4, 2005 || Mauna Kea || Mauna Kea Obs. ||  || align=right | 2.2 km || 
|-id=226 bgcolor=#fefefe
| 596226 ||  || — || May 4, 2005 || Mauna Kea || Mauna Kea Obs. ||  || align=right data-sort-value="0.67" | 670 m || 
|-id=227 bgcolor=#E9E9E9
| 596227 ||  || — || March 11, 2005 || Kitt Peak || Spacewatch ||  || align=right | 2.0 km || 
|-id=228 bgcolor=#fefefe
| 596228 ||  || — || March 20, 2001 || Kitt Peak || Spacewatch ||  || align=right data-sort-value="0.66" | 660 m || 
|-id=229 bgcolor=#fefefe
| 596229 ||  || — || May 7, 2005 || Mount Lemmon || Mount Lemmon Survey || H || align=right data-sort-value="0.59" | 590 m || 
|-id=230 bgcolor=#E9E9E9
| 596230 ||  || — || May 2, 2005 || Kitt Peak || Spacewatch ||  || align=right | 2.1 km || 
|-id=231 bgcolor=#fefefe
| 596231 ||  || — || May 4, 2005 || Mount Lemmon || Mount Lemmon Survey ||  || align=right data-sort-value="0.56" | 560 m || 
|-id=232 bgcolor=#fefefe
| 596232 ||  || — || May 4, 2005 || Kitt Peak || Spacewatch || H || align=right data-sort-value="0.60" | 600 m || 
|-id=233 bgcolor=#fefefe
| 596233 ||  || — || May 8, 2005 || Kitt Peak || Spacewatch ||  || align=right data-sort-value="0.73" | 730 m || 
|-id=234 bgcolor=#fefefe
| 596234 ||  || — || May 10, 2005 || Anderson Mesa || LONEOS ||  || align=right data-sort-value="0.87" | 870 m || 
|-id=235 bgcolor=#fefefe
| 596235 ||  || — || May 10, 2005 || Kitt Peak || Spacewatch || PHO || align=right data-sort-value="0.73" | 730 m || 
|-id=236 bgcolor=#fefefe
| 596236 ||  || — || May 11, 2005 || Palomar || NEAT || H || align=right data-sort-value="0.72" | 720 m || 
|-id=237 bgcolor=#fefefe
| 596237 ||  || — || May 8, 2005 || Mount Lemmon || Mount Lemmon Survey ||  || align=right data-sort-value="0.71" | 710 m || 
|-id=238 bgcolor=#E9E9E9
| 596238 ||  || — || May 8, 2005 || Kitt Peak || Spacewatch ||  || align=right | 1.8 km || 
|-id=239 bgcolor=#fefefe
| 596239 ||  || — || April 11, 2005 || Mount Lemmon || Mount Lemmon Survey ||  || align=right data-sort-value="0.58" | 580 m || 
|-id=240 bgcolor=#E9E9E9
| 596240 ||  || — || April 11, 2005 || Mount Lemmon || Mount Lemmon Survey ||  || align=right | 2.2 km || 
|-id=241 bgcolor=#E9E9E9
| 596241 ||  || — || May 10, 2005 || Mount Lemmon || Mount Lemmon Survey ||  || align=right | 2.4 km || 
|-id=242 bgcolor=#d6d6d6
| 596242 ||  || — || May 10, 2005 || Kitt Peak || Spacewatch ||  || align=right | 2.4 km || 
|-id=243 bgcolor=#d6d6d6
| 596243 ||  || — || May 11, 2005 || Mount Lemmon || Mount Lemmon Survey ||  || align=right | 1.9 km || 
|-id=244 bgcolor=#E9E9E9
| 596244 ||  || — || April 1, 2005 || Anderson Mesa || LONEOS ||  || align=right | 2.9 km || 
|-id=245 bgcolor=#fefefe
| 596245 ||  || — || May 15, 2005 || Mount Lemmon || Mount Lemmon Survey ||  || align=right data-sort-value="0.61" | 610 m || 
|-id=246 bgcolor=#fefefe
| 596246 ||  || — || May 15, 2005 || Mount Lemmon || Mount Lemmon Survey ||  || align=right data-sort-value="0.73" | 730 m || 
|-id=247 bgcolor=#fefefe
| 596247 ||  || — || May 4, 2005 || Kitt Peak || Spacewatch ||  || align=right data-sort-value="0.62" | 620 m || 
|-id=248 bgcolor=#fefefe
| 596248 ||  || — || May 4, 2005 || Mount Lemmon || Mount Lemmon Survey ||  || align=right data-sort-value="0.64" | 640 m || 
|-id=249 bgcolor=#E9E9E9
| 596249 ||  || — || April 16, 2005 || Kitt Peak || Spacewatch ||  || align=right | 2.4 km || 
|-id=250 bgcolor=#E9E9E9
| 596250 ||  || — || May 9, 2005 || Cerro Tololo || M. W. Buie, L. H. Wasserman ||  || align=right | 1.6 km || 
|-id=251 bgcolor=#d6d6d6
| 596251 ||  || — || May 9, 2005 || Cerro Tololo || M. W. Buie, L. H. Wasserman ||  || align=right | 1.9 km || 
|-id=252 bgcolor=#E9E9E9
| 596252 ||  || — || May 10, 2005 || Mount Lemmon || Mount Lemmon Survey ||  || align=right | 1.5 km || 
|-id=253 bgcolor=#E9E9E9
| 596253 ||  || — || May 10, 2005 || Kitt Peak || Spacewatch ||  || align=right | 1.5 km || 
|-id=254 bgcolor=#fefefe
| 596254 ||  || — || June 24, 2009 || Mount Lemmon || Mount Lemmon Survey ||  || align=right data-sort-value="0.71" | 710 m || 
|-id=255 bgcolor=#d6d6d6
| 596255 ||  || — || May 14, 2005 || Kitt Peak || Spacewatch ||  || align=right | 2.3 km || 
|-id=256 bgcolor=#d6d6d6
| 596256 ||  || — || May 20, 2005 || Mount Lemmon || Mount Lemmon Survey ||  || align=right | 2.6 km || 
|-id=257 bgcolor=#d6d6d6
| 596257 ||  || — || August 28, 2006 || Kitt Peak || Spacewatch ||  || align=right | 2.1 km || 
|-id=258 bgcolor=#C2FFFF
| 596258 ||  || — || September 12, 2009 || Kitt Peak || Spacewatch || L4 || align=right | 6.8 km || 
|-id=259 bgcolor=#E9E9E9
| 596259 ||  || — || May 3, 2005 || Kitt Peak || Spacewatch ||  || align=right | 1.3 km || 
|-id=260 bgcolor=#E9E9E9
| 596260 ||  || — || May 17, 2005 || Mount Lemmon || Mount Lemmon Survey ||  || align=right | 1.5 km || 
|-id=261 bgcolor=#fefefe
| 596261 ||  || — || May 8, 2005 || Mount Lemmon || Mount Lemmon Survey ||  || align=right data-sort-value="0.73" | 730 m || 
|-id=262 bgcolor=#E9E9E9
| 596262 ||  || — || June 10, 2005 || Kitt Peak || Spacewatch || JUN || align=right data-sort-value="0.95" | 950 m || 
|-id=263 bgcolor=#fefefe
| 596263 ||  || — || June 10, 2005 || Kitt Peak || Spacewatch ||  || align=right | 1.1 km || 
|-id=264 bgcolor=#E9E9E9
| 596264 ||  || — || June 13, 2005 || Kitt Peak || Spacewatch ||  || align=right | 2.1 km || 
|-id=265 bgcolor=#fefefe
| 596265 ||  || — || June 6, 2005 || Kitt Peak || Spacewatch ||  || align=right data-sort-value="0.72" | 720 m || 
|-id=266 bgcolor=#E9E9E9
| 596266 ||  || — || December 26, 2011 || Mount Lemmon || Mount Lemmon Survey ||  || align=right | 2.0 km || 
|-id=267 bgcolor=#fefefe
| 596267 ||  || — || February 12, 2008 || Kitt Peak || Spacewatch ||  || align=right data-sort-value="0.74" | 740 m || 
|-id=268 bgcolor=#E9E9E9
| 596268 ||  || — || February 1, 2009 || Kitt Peak || Spacewatch ||  || align=right | 1.7 km || 
|-id=269 bgcolor=#d6d6d6
| 596269 ||  || — || October 16, 2012 || Mount Lemmon || Mount Lemmon Survey ||  || align=right | 1.7 km || 
|-id=270 bgcolor=#fefefe
| 596270 ||  || — || June 13, 2005 || Mount Lemmon || Mount Lemmon Survey ||  || align=right data-sort-value="0.67" | 670 m || 
|-id=271 bgcolor=#fefefe
| 596271 ||  || — || June 17, 2005 || Kitt Peak || Spacewatch ||  || align=right data-sort-value="0.94" | 940 m || 
|-id=272 bgcolor=#fefefe
| 596272 ||  || — || June 30, 2005 || Kitt Peak || Spacewatch || critical || align=right data-sort-value="0.59" | 590 m || 
|-id=273 bgcolor=#fefefe
| 596273 ||  || — || June 17, 2005 || Mount Lemmon || Mount Lemmon Survey ||  || align=right data-sort-value="0.58" | 580 m || 
|-id=274 bgcolor=#d6d6d6
| 596274 ||  || — || June 29, 2005 || Kitt Peak || Spacewatch ||  || align=right | 2.9 km || 
|-id=275 bgcolor=#fefefe
| 596275 ||  || — || July 1, 2005 || Kitt Peak || Spacewatch ||  || align=right data-sort-value="0.90" | 900 m || 
|-id=276 bgcolor=#E9E9E9
| 596276 ||  || — || October 14, 2001 || Kitt Peak || Spacewatch ||  || align=right | 1.1 km || 
|-id=277 bgcolor=#E9E9E9
| 596277 ||  || — || June 13, 2005 || Mount Lemmon || Mount Lemmon Survey ||  || align=right | 2.0 km || 
|-id=278 bgcolor=#fefefe
| 596278 ||  || — || July 5, 2005 || Palomar || NEAT ||  || align=right data-sort-value="0.77" | 770 m || 
|-id=279 bgcolor=#fefefe
| 596279 ||  || — || July 5, 2005 || Kitt Peak || Spacewatch ||  || align=right data-sort-value="0.62" | 620 m || 
|-id=280 bgcolor=#fefefe
| 596280 ||  || — || July 9, 2005 || Kitt Peak || Spacewatch ||  || align=right data-sort-value="0.57" | 570 m || 
|-id=281 bgcolor=#fefefe
| 596281 ||  || — || July 15, 2005 || Kitt Peak || Spacewatch ||  || align=right data-sort-value="0.50" | 500 m || 
|-id=282 bgcolor=#d6d6d6
| 596282 ||  || — || July 7, 2005 || Mauna Kea || Mauna Kea Obs. ||  || align=right | 1.6 km || 
|-id=283 bgcolor=#E9E9E9
| 596283 ||  || — || October 28, 2010 || Catalina || CSS ||  || align=right | 1.2 km || 
|-id=284 bgcolor=#FA8072
| 596284 ||  || — || July 30, 2005 || Campo Imperatore || A. Boattini || H || align=right data-sort-value="0.72" | 720 m || 
|-id=285 bgcolor=#E9E9E9
| 596285 ||  || — || July 29, 2005 || Palomar || NEAT || EUN || align=right | 1.3 km || 
|-id=286 bgcolor=#fefefe
| 596286 ||  || — || May 1, 2001 || Kitt Peak || Spacewatch ||  || align=right data-sort-value="0.83" | 830 m || 
|-id=287 bgcolor=#FA8072
| 596287 ||  || — || July 1, 2005 || Catalina || CSS ||  || align=right | 2.1 km || 
|-id=288 bgcolor=#E9E9E9
| 596288 ||  || — || July 31, 2005 || Palomar || NEAT ||  || align=right | 2.2 km || 
|-id=289 bgcolor=#fefefe
| 596289 ||  || — || February 10, 2011 || Mount Lemmon || Mount Lemmon Survey ||  || align=right data-sort-value="0.93" | 930 m || 
|-id=290 bgcolor=#E9E9E9
| 596290 ||  || — || July 28, 2005 || Palomar || NEAT ||  || align=right | 2.0 km || 
|-id=291 bgcolor=#E9E9E9
| 596291 ||  || — || July 30, 2005 || Palomar || NEAT ||  || align=right | 1.9 km || 
|-id=292 bgcolor=#fefefe
| 596292 ||  || — || July 18, 2005 || Palomar || NEAT ||  || align=right data-sort-value="0.80" | 800 m || 
|-id=293 bgcolor=#E9E9E9
| 596293 ||  || — || November 18, 2014 || Haleakala || Pan-STARRS ||  || align=right data-sort-value="0.94" | 940 m || 
|-id=294 bgcolor=#d6d6d6
| 596294 ||  || — || July 31, 2005 || Palomar || NEAT ||  || align=right | 3.3 km || 
|-id=295 bgcolor=#fefefe
| 596295 ||  || — || August 4, 2005 || Palomar || NEAT || H || align=right data-sort-value="0.50" | 500 m || 
|-id=296 bgcolor=#fefefe
| 596296 ||  || — || July 27, 2005 || Palomar || NEAT ||  || align=right | 1.2 km || 
|-id=297 bgcolor=#fefefe
| 596297 ||  || — || August 14, 2005 || Pla D'Arguines || R. Ferrando, M. Ferrando ||  || align=right data-sort-value="0.61" | 610 m || 
|-id=298 bgcolor=#fefefe
| 596298 ||  || — || August 24, 2005 || Palomar || NEAT || H || align=right data-sort-value="0.77" | 770 m || 
|-id=299 bgcolor=#FA8072
| 596299 ||  || — || August 3, 2005 || Palomar || NEAT ||  || align=right data-sort-value="0.86" | 860 m || 
|-id=300 bgcolor=#fefefe
| 596300 ||  || — || August 28, 2005 || Kitt Peak || Spacewatch ||  || align=right data-sort-value="0.73" | 730 m || 
|}

596301–596400 

|-bgcolor=#fefefe
| 596301 ||  || — || August 28, 2005 || Kitt Peak || Spacewatch ||  || align=right data-sort-value="0.64" | 640 m || 
|-id=302 bgcolor=#fefefe
| 596302 ||  || — || August 26, 2005 || Campo Imperatore || A. Boattini || H || align=right data-sort-value="0.63" | 630 m || 
|-id=303 bgcolor=#fefefe
| 596303 ||  || — || August 31, 2005 || Kitt Peak || Spacewatch ||  || align=right data-sort-value="0.64" | 640 m || 
|-id=304 bgcolor=#fefefe
| 596304 ||  || — || August 28, 2005 || Anderson Mesa || LONEOS ||  || align=right data-sort-value="0.67" | 670 m || 
|-id=305 bgcolor=#d6d6d6
| 596305 ||  || — || August 31, 2005 || Kitt Peak || Spacewatch ||  || align=right | 2.4 km || 
|-id=306 bgcolor=#d6d6d6
| 596306 ||  || — || August 31, 2005 || Kitt Peak || Spacewatch ||  || align=right | 3.5 km || 
|-id=307 bgcolor=#d6d6d6
| 596307 ||  || — || August 30, 2005 || Kitt Peak || Spacewatch ||  || align=right | 2.1 km || 
|-id=308 bgcolor=#d6d6d6
| 596308 ||  || — || August 28, 2005 || Kitt Peak || Spacewatch ||  || align=right | 2.8 km || 
|-id=309 bgcolor=#d6d6d6
| 596309 ||  || — || August 28, 2005 || Kitt Peak || Spacewatch ||  || align=right | 2.0 km || 
|-id=310 bgcolor=#d6d6d6
| 596310 ||  || — || August 28, 2005 || Kitt Peak || Spacewatch ||  || align=right | 1.9 km || 
|-id=311 bgcolor=#fefefe
| 596311 ||  || — || July 11, 2005 || Mount Lemmon || Mount Lemmon Survey ||  || align=right data-sort-value="0.80" | 800 m || 
|-id=312 bgcolor=#d6d6d6
| 596312 ||  || — || August 27, 2005 || Palomar || NEAT ||  || align=right | 3.2 km || 
|-id=313 bgcolor=#d6d6d6
| 596313 ||  || — || August 6, 2005 || Palomar || NEAT || HYG || align=right | 3.1 km || 
|-id=314 bgcolor=#E9E9E9
| 596314 ||  || — || August 27, 2005 || Palomar || NEAT ||  || align=right data-sort-value="0.89" | 890 m || 
|-id=315 bgcolor=#fefefe
| 596315 ||  || — || September 1, 2005 || Kitt Peak || Spacewatch ||  || align=right data-sort-value="0.84" | 840 m || 
|-id=316 bgcolor=#d6d6d6
| 596316 ||  || — || August 26, 2005 || Palomar || NEAT || NAE || align=right | 2.0 km || 
|-id=317 bgcolor=#fefefe
| 596317 ||  || — || August 31, 2005 || Kitt Peak || Spacewatch ||  || align=right data-sort-value="0.81" | 810 m || 
|-id=318 bgcolor=#fefefe
| 596318 ||  || — || August 27, 2005 || Palomar || NEAT ||  || align=right data-sort-value="0.72" | 720 m || 
|-id=319 bgcolor=#E9E9E9
| 596319 ||  || — || August 31, 2005 || Kitt Peak || Spacewatch ||  || align=right | 1.5 km || 
|-id=320 bgcolor=#d6d6d6
| 596320 ||  || — || August 30, 2005 || Kitt Peak || Spacewatch ||  || align=right | 2.2 km || 
|-id=321 bgcolor=#fefefe
| 596321 ||  || — || August 30, 2005 || Kitt Peak || Spacewatch ||  || align=right data-sort-value="0.52" | 520 m || 
|-id=322 bgcolor=#fefefe
| 596322 ||  || — || April 3, 2008 || Mount Lemmon || Mount Lemmon Survey ||  || align=right data-sort-value="0.52" | 520 m || 
|-id=323 bgcolor=#fefefe
| 596323 ||  || — || August 28, 2005 || Kitt Peak || Spacewatch ||  || align=right data-sort-value="0.53" | 530 m || 
|-id=324 bgcolor=#d6d6d6
| 596324 ||  || — || August 31, 2005 || Kitt Peak || Spacewatch || 3:2 || align=right | 3.0 km || 
|-id=325 bgcolor=#d6d6d6
| 596325 ||  || — || September 1, 2005 || Kitt Peak || Spacewatch ||  || align=right | 2.2 km || 
|-id=326 bgcolor=#d6d6d6
| 596326 ||  || — || August 31, 2005 || Palomar || NEAT || THB || align=right | 2.8 km || 
|-id=327 bgcolor=#d6d6d6
| 596327 ||  || — || September 3, 2005 || Apache Point || SDSS Collaboration ||  || align=right | 2.6 km || 
|-id=328 bgcolor=#d6d6d6
| 596328 ||  || — || September 26, 2005 || Apache Point || SDSS Collaboration ||  || align=right | 2.0 km || 
|-id=329 bgcolor=#fefefe
| 596329 ||  || — || May 14, 2008 || Kitt Peak || Spacewatch ||  || align=right data-sort-value="0.60" | 600 m || 
|-id=330 bgcolor=#d6d6d6
| 596330 ||  || — || March 12, 2013 || Palomar || PTF ||  || align=right | 3.2 km || 
|-id=331 bgcolor=#d6d6d6
| 596331 ||  || — || November 17, 2011 || Kitt Peak || Spacewatch ||  || align=right | 2.2 km || 
|-id=332 bgcolor=#d6d6d6
| 596332 ||  || — || October 25, 2011 || Haleakala || Pan-STARRS ||  || align=right | 2.4 km || 
|-id=333 bgcolor=#fefefe
| 596333 ||  || — || February 13, 2008 || Kitt Peak || Spacewatch ||  || align=right data-sort-value="0.82" | 820 m || 
|-id=334 bgcolor=#d6d6d6
| 596334 ||  || — || September 13, 2005 || Kitt Peak || Spacewatch ||  || align=right | 2.0 km || 
|-id=335 bgcolor=#d6d6d6
| 596335 ||  || — || September 13, 2005 || Kitt Peak || Spacewatch ||  || align=right | 1.6 km || 
|-id=336 bgcolor=#E9E9E9
| 596336 ||  || — || August 26, 2005 || Palomar || NEAT ||  || align=right | 1.3 km || 
|-id=337 bgcolor=#E9E9E9
| 596337 ||  || — || September 24, 2005 || Kitt Peak || Spacewatch ||  || align=right | 1.2 km || 
|-id=338 bgcolor=#fefefe
| 596338 ||  || — || September 24, 2005 || Kitt Peak || Spacewatch || NYS || align=right data-sort-value="0.53" | 530 m || 
|-id=339 bgcolor=#d6d6d6
| 596339 ||  || — || September 29, 2005 || Kitt Peak || Spacewatch ||  || align=right | 1.5 km || 
|-id=340 bgcolor=#d6d6d6
| 596340 ||  || — || September 29, 2005 || Mount Lemmon || Mount Lemmon Survey || 3:2 || align=right | 4.1 km || 
|-id=341 bgcolor=#d6d6d6
| 596341 ||  || — || September 26, 2005 || Kitt Peak || Spacewatch || SHU3:2 || align=right | 4.8 km || 
|-id=342 bgcolor=#E9E9E9
| 596342 ||  || — || September 27, 2005 || Kitt Peak || Spacewatch ||  || align=right | 1.1 km || 
|-id=343 bgcolor=#fefefe
| 596343 ||  || — || September 23, 2005 || Kitt Peak || Spacewatch ||  || align=right data-sort-value="0.48" | 480 m || 
|-id=344 bgcolor=#d6d6d6
| 596344 ||  || — || September 29, 2005 || Kitt Peak || Spacewatch ||  || align=right | 3.1 km || 
|-id=345 bgcolor=#d6d6d6
| 596345 ||  || — || September 29, 2005 || Kitt Peak || Spacewatch ||  || align=right | 2.5 km || 
|-id=346 bgcolor=#d6d6d6
| 596346 ||  || — || September 29, 2005 || Mount Lemmon || Mount Lemmon Survey ||  || align=right | 1.9 km || 
|-id=347 bgcolor=#d6d6d6
| 596347 ||  || — || September 29, 2005 || Mount Lemmon || Mount Lemmon Survey ||  || align=right | 2.2 km || 
|-id=348 bgcolor=#d6d6d6
| 596348 ||  || — || September 30, 2005 || Kitt Peak || Spacewatch ||  || align=right | 2.1 km || 
|-id=349 bgcolor=#E9E9E9
| 596349 ||  || — || August 30, 2005 || Kitt Peak || Spacewatch ||  || align=right | 1.3 km || 
|-id=350 bgcolor=#fefefe
| 596350 ||  || — || September 30, 2005 || Mount Lemmon || Mount Lemmon Survey ||  || align=right data-sort-value="0.71" | 710 m || 
|-id=351 bgcolor=#FA8072
| 596351 ||  || — || September 10, 2005 || Anderson Mesa || LONEOS ||  || align=right data-sort-value="0.62" | 620 m || 
|-id=352 bgcolor=#fefefe
| 596352 ||  || — || September 29, 2005 || Kitt Peak || Spacewatch ||  || align=right data-sort-value="0.90" | 900 m || 
|-id=353 bgcolor=#d6d6d6
| 596353 ||  || — || September 30, 2005 || Kitt Peak || Spacewatch ||  || align=right | 2.5 km || 
|-id=354 bgcolor=#d6d6d6
| 596354 ||  || — || September 29, 2005 || Mount Lemmon || Mount Lemmon Survey ||  || align=right | 2.3 km || 
|-id=355 bgcolor=#fefefe
| 596355 ||  || — || September 29, 2005 || Kitt Peak || Spacewatch ||  || align=right data-sort-value="0.60" | 600 m || 
|-id=356 bgcolor=#fefefe
| 596356 ||  || — || August 31, 2005 || Kitt Peak || Spacewatch || NYS || align=right data-sort-value="0.36" | 360 m || 
|-id=357 bgcolor=#E9E9E9
| 596357 ||  || — || September 30, 2005 || Kitt Peak || Spacewatch ||  || align=right | 1.8 km || 
|-id=358 bgcolor=#fefefe
| 596358 ||  || — || May 23, 2001 || Cerro Tololo || J. L. Elliot, L. H. Wasserman ||  || align=right data-sort-value="0.91" | 910 m || 
|-id=359 bgcolor=#FA8072
| 596359 ||  || — || September 25, 2005 || Kitt Peak || Spacewatch ||  || align=right data-sort-value="0.89" | 890 m || 
|-id=360 bgcolor=#E9E9E9
| 596360 ||  || — || September 29, 2005 || Kitt Peak || Spacewatch ||  || align=right | 1.9 km || 
|-id=361 bgcolor=#d6d6d6
| 596361 ||  || — || September 30, 2005 || Palomar || NEAT ||  || align=right | 2.7 km || 
|-id=362 bgcolor=#d6d6d6
| 596362 ||  || — || September 1, 2005 || Palomar || NEAT ||  || align=right | 4.4 km || 
|-id=363 bgcolor=#fefefe
| 596363 ||  || — || September 27, 2005 || Kitt Peak || Spacewatch ||  || align=right data-sort-value="0.50" | 500 m || 
|-id=364 bgcolor=#E9E9E9
| 596364 ||  || — || September 30, 2005 || Kitt Peak || Spacewatch ||  || align=right | 2.1 km || 
|-id=365 bgcolor=#fefefe
| 596365 ||  || — || September 29, 2005 || Mount Lemmon || Mount Lemmon Survey ||  || align=right data-sort-value="0.52" | 520 m || 
|-id=366 bgcolor=#E9E9E9
| 596366 ||  || — || September 29, 2005 || Kitt Peak || Spacewatch ||  || align=right | 2.1 km || 
|-id=367 bgcolor=#d6d6d6
| 596367 ||  || — || September 13, 2005 || Kitt Peak || Spacewatch ||  || align=right | 1.9 km || 
|-id=368 bgcolor=#d6d6d6
| 596368 ||  || — || September 29, 2005 || Mount Lemmon || Mount Lemmon Survey ||  || align=right | 2.0 km || 
|-id=369 bgcolor=#d6d6d6
| 596369 ||  || — || August 10, 2015 || Haleakala || Pan-STARRS ||  || align=right | 2.1 km || 
|-id=370 bgcolor=#fefefe
| 596370 ||  || — || January 3, 2009 || Kitt Peak || Spacewatch ||  || align=right data-sort-value="0.61" | 610 m || 
|-id=371 bgcolor=#E9E9E9
| 596371 ||  || — || January 13, 2018 || Mount Lemmon || Mount Lemmon Survey ||  || align=right data-sort-value="0.89" | 890 m || 
|-id=372 bgcolor=#d6d6d6
| 596372 ||  || — || April 29, 2014 || Haleakala || Pan-STARRS ||  || align=right | 2.1 km || 
|-id=373 bgcolor=#d6d6d6
| 596373 ||  || — || September 30, 2005 || Mount Lemmon || Mount Lemmon Survey ||  || align=right | 2.5 km || 
|-id=374 bgcolor=#E9E9E9
| 596374 ||  || — || August 4, 2013 || Haleakala || Pan-STARRS ||  || align=right | 1.3 km || 
|-id=375 bgcolor=#d6d6d6
| 596375 ||  || — || September 12, 2015 || Haleakala || Pan-STARRS ||  || align=right | 1.9 km || 
|-id=376 bgcolor=#d6d6d6
| 596376 ||  || — || September 30, 2005 || Mount Lemmon || Mount Lemmon Survey ||  || align=right | 1.8 km || 
|-id=377 bgcolor=#d6d6d6
| 596377 ||  || — || September 30, 2005 || Mount Lemmon || Mount Lemmon Survey ||  || align=right | 1.9 km || 
|-id=378 bgcolor=#d6d6d6
| 596378 ||  || — || September 30, 2005 || Mount Lemmon || Mount Lemmon Survey ||  || align=right | 1.6 km || 
|-id=379 bgcolor=#E9E9E9
| 596379 ||  || — || October 1, 2005 || Catalina || CSS ||  || align=right | 1.6 km || 
|-id=380 bgcolor=#d6d6d6
| 596380 ||  || — || October 1, 2005 || Mount Lemmon || Mount Lemmon Survey ||  || align=right | 2.3 km || 
|-id=381 bgcolor=#d6d6d6
| 596381 ||  || — || October 1, 2005 || Kitt Peak || Spacewatch ||  || align=right | 2.0 km || 
|-id=382 bgcolor=#fefefe
| 596382 ||  || — || October 1, 2005 || Kitt Peak || Spacewatch || NYS || align=right data-sort-value="0.48" | 480 m || 
|-id=383 bgcolor=#d6d6d6
| 596383 ||  || — || October 1, 2005 || Kitt Peak || Spacewatch ||  || align=right | 2.0 km || 
|-id=384 bgcolor=#d6d6d6
| 596384 ||  || — || October 1, 2005 || Mount Lemmon || Mount Lemmon Survey ||  || align=right | 1.8 km || 
|-id=385 bgcolor=#d6d6d6
| 596385 ||  || — || October 5, 2005 || Kitt Peak || Spacewatch || 3:2 || align=right | 2.4 km || 
|-id=386 bgcolor=#d6d6d6
| 596386 ||  || — || October 7, 2005 || Kitt Peak || Spacewatch ||  || align=right | 2.2 km || 
|-id=387 bgcolor=#fefefe
| 596387 ||  || — || October 7, 2005 || Mount Lemmon || Mount Lemmon Survey || NYS || align=right data-sort-value="0.45" | 450 m || 
|-id=388 bgcolor=#fefefe
| 596388 ||  || — || September 30, 2005 || Kitt Peak || Spacewatch ||  || align=right data-sort-value="0.65" | 650 m || 
|-id=389 bgcolor=#d6d6d6
| 596389 ||  || — || October 8, 2005 || Kitt Peak || Spacewatch ||  || align=right | 2.2 km || 
|-id=390 bgcolor=#E9E9E9
| 596390 ||  || — || September 29, 2005 || Kitt Peak || Spacewatch ||  || align=right | 1.5 km || 
|-id=391 bgcolor=#d6d6d6
| 596391 ||  || — || October 8, 2005 || Kitt Peak || Spacewatch || 3:2 || align=right | 3.5 km || 
|-id=392 bgcolor=#d6d6d6
| 596392 ||  || — || October 7, 2005 || Mount Lemmon || Mount Lemmon Survey ||  || align=right | 2.1 km || 
|-id=393 bgcolor=#fefefe
| 596393 ||  || — || September 2, 2005 || Palomar || NEAT || H || align=right data-sort-value="0.77" | 770 m || 
|-id=394 bgcolor=#E9E9E9
| 596394 ||  || — || September 30, 2005 || Catalina || CSS || EUN || align=right | 1.0 km || 
|-id=395 bgcolor=#fefefe
| 596395 ||  || — || August 31, 2005 || Palomar || NEAT ||  || align=right data-sort-value="0.96" | 960 m || 
|-id=396 bgcolor=#fefefe
| 596396 ||  || — || October 5, 2005 || Kitt Peak || Spacewatch || H || align=right data-sort-value="0.44" | 440 m || 
|-id=397 bgcolor=#d6d6d6
| 596397 ||  || — || October 1, 2005 || Mount Lemmon || Mount Lemmon Survey ||  || align=right | 2.6 km || 
|-id=398 bgcolor=#fefefe
| 596398 ||  || — || September 30, 2005 || Mount Lemmon || Mount Lemmon Survey ||  || align=right data-sort-value="0.39" | 390 m || 
|-id=399 bgcolor=#fefefe
| 596399 ||  || — || October 13, 2005 || Mount Lemmon || Mount Lemmon Survey ||  || align=right data-sort-value="0.89" | 890 m || 
|-id=400 bgcolor=#d6d6d6
| 596400 ||  || — || October 11, 2005 || Kitt Peak || Spacewatch ||  || align=right | 2.3 km || 
|}

596401–596500 

|-bgcolor=#d6d6d6
| 596401 ||  || — || March 28, 2008 || Mount Lemmon || Mount Lemmon Survey ||  || align=right | 2.2 km || 
|-id=402 bgcolor=#d6d6d6
| 596402 ||  || — || April 4, 2014 || Haleakala || Pan-STARRS ||  || align=right | 2.3 km || 
|-id=403 bgcolor=#fefefe
| 596403 ||  || — || October 1, 2005 || Mount Lemmon || Mount Lemmon Survey || H || align=right data-sort-value="0.41" | 410 m || 
|-id=404 bgcolor=#d6d6d6
| 596404 ||  || — || September 26, 2000 || Kitt Peak || Spacewatch ||  || align=right | 1.9 km || 
|-id=405 bgcolor=#d6d6d6
| 596405 ||  || — || February 17, 2013 || Kitt Peak || Spacewatch ||  || align=right | 2.1 km || 
|-id=406 bgcolor=#d6d6d6
| 596406 ||  || — || October 1, 2010 || Mount Lemmon || Mount Lemmon Survey ||  || align=right | 2.2 km || 
|-id=407 bgcolor=#E9E9E9
| 596407 ||  || — || October 1, 2005 || Mount Lemmon || Mount Lemmon Survey ||  || align=right data-sort-value="0.99" | 990 m || 
|-id=408 bgcolor=#d6d6d6
| 596408 ||  || — || October 1, 2005 || Kitt Peak || Spacewatch ||  || align=right | 2.1 km || 
|-id=409 bgcolor=#d6d6d6
| 596409 ||  || — || October 28, 2011 || Mount Lemmon || Mount Lemmon Survey ||  || align=right | 2.2 km || 
|-id=410 bgcolor=#d6d6d6
| 596410 ||  || — || June 24, 2014 || Haleakala || Pan-STARRS ||  || align=right | 1.9 km || 
|-id=411 bgcolor=#d6d6d6
| 596411 ||  || — || October 2, 2005 || Mount Lemmon || Mount Lemmon Survey || 3:2 || align=right | 3.8 km || 
|-id=412 bgcolor=#d6d6d6
| 596412 ||  || — || May 6, 2014 || Haleakala || Pan-STARRS ||  || align=right | 2.2 km || 
|-id=413 bgcolor=#d6d6d6
| 596413 ||  || — || October 2, 2013 || Haleakala || Pan-STARRS || 3:2 || align=right | 3.3 km || 
|-id=414 bgcolor=#fefefe
| 596414 ||  || — || October 5, 2005 || Kitt Peak || Spacewatch || H || align=right data-sort-value="0.49" | 490 m || 
|-id=415 bgcolor=#d6d6d6
| 596415 ||  || — || October 1, 2005 || Mount Lemmon || Mount Lemmon Survey || 3:2 || align=right | 2.8 km || 
|-id=416 bgcolor=#d6d6d6
| 596416 ||  || — || October 6, 2005 || Mount Lemmon || Mount Lemmon Survey || 3:2 || align=right | 4.3 km || 
|-id=417 bgcolor=#d6d6d6
| 596417 ||  || — || October 1, 2005 || Kitt Peak || Spacewatch || 3:2 || align=right | 3.8 km || 
|-id=418 bgcolor=#d6d6d6
| 596418 ||  || — || October 1, 2005 || Mount Lemmon || Mount Lemmon Survey ||  || align=right | 1.8 km || 
|-id=419 bgcolor=#E9E9E9
| 596419 ||  || — || October 4, 2005 || Mount Lemmon || Mount Lemmon Survey ||  || align=right | 1.2 km || 
|-id=420 bgcolor=#d6d6d6
| 596420 ||  || — || October 10, 2005 || Kitt Peak || Spacewatch ||  || align=right | 1.9 km || 
|-id=421 bgcolor=#E9E9E9
| 596421 ||  || — || October 22, 2005 || Kitt Peak || Spacewatch ||  || align=right data-sort-value="0.76" | 760 m || 
|-id=422 bgcolor=#d6d6d6
| 596422 ||  || — || October 22, 2005 || Kitt Peak || Spacewatch ||  || align=right | 2.4 km || 
|-id=423 bgcolor=#d6d6d6
| 596423 ||  || — || October 23, 2005 || Kitt Peak || Spacewatch ||  || align=right | 2.6 km || 
|-id=424 bgcolor=#d6d6d6
| 596424 ||  || — || October 24, 2005 || Kitt Peak || Spacewatch ||  || align=right | 2.6 km || 
|-id=425 bgcolor=#E9E9E9
| 596425 ||  || — || October 25, 2005 || Mount Lemmon || Mount Lemmon Survey ||  || align=right | 1.2 km || 
|-id=426 bgcolor=#d6d6d6
| 596426 ||  || — || October 22, 2005 || Kitt Peak || Spacewatch ||  || align=right | 2.6 km || 
|-id=427 bgcolor=#d6d6d6
| 596427 ||  || — || October 22, 2005 || Kitt Peak || Spacewatch ||  || align=right | 2.8 km || 
|-id=428 bgcolor=#fefefe
| 596428 ||  || — || October 24, 2005 || Kitt Peak || Spacewatch ||  || align=right data-sort-value="0.65" | 650 m || 
|-id=429 bgcolor=#fefefe
| 596429 ||  || — || October 24, 2005 || Kitt Peak || Spacewatch || H || align=right data-sort-value="0.47" | 470 m || 
|-id=430 bgcolor=#fefefe
| 596430 ||  || — || October 24, 2005 || Kitt Peak || Spacewatch ||  || align=right data-sort-value="0.53" | 530 m || 
|-id=431 bgcolor=#d6d6d6
| 596431 ||  || — || October 24, 2005 || Kitt Peak || Spacewatch ||  || align=right | 2.5 km || 
|-id=432 bgcolor=#d6d6d6
| 596432 ||  || — || October 26, 2005 || Kitt Peak || Spacewatch ||  || align=right | 2.2 km || 
|-id=433 bgcolor=#fefefe
| 596433 ||  || — || October 26, 2005 || Kitt Peak || Spacewatch ||  || align=right data-sort-value="0.40" | 400 m || 
|-id=434 bgcolor=#d6d6d6
| 596434 ||  || — || October 26, 2005 || Palomar || NEAT ||  || align=right | 3.9 km || 
|-id=435 bgcolor=#d6d6d6
| 596435 ||  || — || October 24, 2005 || Kitt Peak || Spacewatch ||  || align=right | 1.5 km || 
|-id=436 bgcolor=#fefefe
| 596436 ||  || — || October 24, 2005 || Kitt Peak || Spacewatch ||  || align=right data-sort-value="0.75" | 750 m || 
|-id=437 bgcolor=#FA8072
| 596437 ||  || — || October 1, 2005 || Mount Lemmon || Mount Lemmon Survey ||  || align=right | 1.5 km || 
|-id=438 bgcolor=#d6d6d6
| 596438 ||  || — || October 27, 2005 || Kitt Peak || Spacewatch ||  || align=right | 1.9 km || 
|-id=439 bgcolor=#d6d6d6
| 596439 ||  || — || October 27, 2005 || Kitt Peak || Spacewatch ||  || align=right | 2.1 km || 
|-id=440 bgcolor=#fefefe
| 596440 ||  || — || October 25, 2005 || Kitt Peak || Spacewatch ||  || align=right data-sort-value="0.58" | 580 m || 
|-id=441 bgcolor=#E9E9E9
| 596441 ||  || — || October 25, 2005 || Kitt Peak || Spacewatch ||  || align=right data-sort-value="0.66" | 660 m || 
|-id=442 bgcolor=#fefefe
| 596442 ||  || — || October 25, 2005 || Kitt Peak || Spacewatch ||  || align=right data-sort-value="0.75" | 750 m || 
|-id=443 bgcolor=#fefefe
| 596443 ||  || — || October 25, 2005 || Kitt Peak || Spacewatch ||  || align=right data-sort-value="0.94" | 940 m || 
|-id=444 bgcolor=#d6d6d6
| 596444 ||  || — || October 28, 2005 || Mount Lemmon || Mount Lemmon Survey ||  || align=right | 2.3 km || 
|-id=445 bgcolor=#d6d6d6
| 596445 ||  || — || October 28, 2005 || Mount Lemmon || Mount Lemmon Survey || 3:2 || align=right | 4.1 km || 
|-id=446 bgcolor=#fefefe
| 596446 ||  || — || October 25, 2005 || Kitt Peak || Spacewatch ||  || align=right data-sort-value="0.80" | 800 m || 
|-id=447 bgcolor=#FA8072
| 596447 ||  || — || October 25, 2005 || Kitt Peak || Spacewatch || H || align=right data-sort-value="0.46" | 460 m || 
|-id=448 bgcolor=#E9E9E9
| 596448 ||  || — || October 23, 2001 || Kitt Peak || Spacewatch ||  || align=right data-sort-value="0.59" | 590 m || 
|-id=449 bgcolor=#fefefe
| 596449 ||  || — || October 25, 2005 || Kitt Peak || Spacewatch || H || align=right data-sort-value="0.45" | 450 m || 
|-id=450 bgcolor=#d6d6d6
| 596450 ||  || — || October 26, 2005 || Kitt Peak || Spacewatch ||  || align=right | 1.9 km || 
|-id=451 bgcolor=#E9E9E9
| 596451 ||  || — || October 26, 2005 || Kitt Peak || Spacewatch ||  || align=right data-sort-value="0.74" | 740 m || 
|-id=452 bgcolor=#d6d6d6
| 596452 ||  || — || October 26, 2005 || Kitt Peak || Spacewatch ||  || align=right | 2.2 km || 
|-id=453 bgcolor=#E9E9E9
| 596453 ||  || — || October 26, 2005 || Kitt Peak || Spacewatch ||  || align=right data-sort-value="0.79" | 790 m || 
|-id=454 bgcolor=#d6d6d6
| 596454 ||  || — || October 1, 2005 || Mount Lemmon || Mount Lemmon Survey ||  || align=right | 2.2 km || 
|-id=455 bgcolor=#d6d6d6
| 596455 ||  || — || October 22, 2005 || Kitt Peak || Spacewatch ||  || align=right | 1.8 km || 
|-id=456 bgcolor=#E9E9E9
| 596456 ||  || — || October 29, 2005 || Catalina || CSS ||  || align=right | 2.0 km || 
|-id=457 bgcolor=#E9E9E9
| 596457 ||  || — || October 29, 2005 || Mount Lemmon || Mount Lemmon Survey ||  || align=right data-sort-value="0.60" | 600 m || 
|-id=458 bgcolor=#E9E9E9
| 596458 ||  || — || October 29, 2005 || Mount Lemmon || Mount Lemmon Survey ||  || align=right | 2.5 km || 
|-id=459 bgcolor=#d6d6d6
| 596459 ||  || — || October 31, 2005 || Kitt Peak || Spacewatch || Tj (2.93) || align=right | 5.1 km || 
|-id=460 bgcolor=#d6d6d6
| 596460 ||  || — || October 25, 2005 || Kitt Peak || Spacewatch ||  || align=right | 2.4 km || 
|-id=461 bgcolor=#E9E9E9
| 596461 ||  || — || October 27, 2005 || Kitt Peak || Spacewatch ||  || align=right data-sort-value="0.66" | 660 m || 
|-id=462 bgcolor=#E9E9E9
| 596462 ||  || — || October 25, 2001 || Kitt Peak || Spacewatch ||  || align=right data-sort-value="0.73" | 730 m || 
|-id=463 bgcolor=#d6d6d6
| 596463 ||  || — || October 29, 2005 || Mount Lemmon || Mount Lemmon Survey ||  || align=right | 2.2 km || 
|-id=464 bgcolor=#d6d6d6
| 596464 ||  || — || October 30, 2005 || Mount Lemmon || Mount Lemmon Survey ||  || align=right | 2.2 km || 
|-id=465 bgcolor=#fefefe
| 596465 ||  || — || October 7, 2012 || Haleakala || Pan-STARRS ||  || align=right data-sort-value="0.59" | 590 m || 
|-id=466 bgcolor=#d6d6d6
| 596466 ||  || — || October 25, 2005 || Kitt Peak || Spacewatch ||  || align=right | 2.4 km || 
|-id=467 bgcolor=#d6d6d6
| 596467 ||  || — || October 25, 2005 || Kitt Peak || Spacewatch ||  || align=right | 2.2 km || 
|-id=468 bgcolor=#d6d6d6
| 596468 ||  || — || October 27, 2005 || Mount Lemmon || Mount Lemmon Survey ||  || align=right | 2.1 km || 
|-id=469 bgcolor=#d6d6d6
| 596469 ||  || — || October 29, 2005 || Mount Lemmon || Mount Lemmon Survey || KOR || align=right | 1.0 km || 
|-id=470 bgcolor=#E9E9E9
| 596470 ||  || — || October 29, 2005 || Mount Lemmon || Mount Lemmon Survey ||  || align=right | 1.1 km || 
|-id=471 bgcolor=#d6d6d6
| 596471 ||  || — || October 30, 2005 || Kitt Peak || Spacewatch ||  || align=right | 1.8 km || 
|-id=472 bgcolor=#d6d6d6
| 596472 ||  || — || October 30, 2005 || Kitt Peak || Spacewatch ||  || align=right | 2.4 km || 
|-id=473 bgcolor=#fefefe
| 596473 ||  || — || October 30, 2005 || Kitt Peak || Spacewatch ||  || align=right data-sort-value="0.52" | 520 m || 
|-id=474 bgcolor=#fefefe
| 596474 ||  || — || October 27, 2005 || Mount Lemmon || Mount Lemmon Survey ||  || align=right data-sort-value="0.80" | 800 m || 
|-id=475 bgcolor=#d6d6d6
| 596475 ||  || — || October 24, 2005 || Palomar || NEAT ||  || align=right | 3.9 km || 
|-id=476 bgcolor=#fefefe
| 596476 ||  || — || October 26, 2005 || Palomar || NEAT ||  || align=right data-sort-value="0.85" | 850 m || 
|-id=477 bgcolor=#E9E9E9
| 596477 ||  || — || October 24, 2005 || Mauna Kea || Mauna Kea Obs. ||  || align=right | 1.4 km || 
|-id=478 bgcolor=#E9E9E9
| 596478 ||  || — || April 23, 2007 || Mount Lemmon || Mount Lemmon Survey ||  || align=right | 1.1 km || 
|-id=479 bgcolor=#d6d6d6
| 596479 ||  || — || October 25, 2005 || Apache Point || SDSS Collaboration ||  || align=right | 2.3 km || 
|-id=480 bgcolor=#fefefe
| 596480 ||  || — || February 10, 2007 || Mount Lemmon || Mount Lemmon Survey ||  || align=right data-sort-value="0.80" | 800 m || 
|-id=481 bgcolor=#d6d6d6
| 596481 ||  || — || October 30, 2005 || Apache Point || SDSS Collaboration ||  || align=right | 2.0 km || 
|-id=482 bgcolor=#d6d6d6
| 596482 ||  || — || October 26, 2005 || Kitt Peak || Spacewatch ||  || align=right | 2.7 km || 
|-id=483 bgcolor=#E9E9E9
| 596483 ||  || — || October 1, 2005 || Mount Lemmon || Mount Lemmon Survey ||  || align=right | 1.7 km || 
|-id=484 bgcolor=#d6d6d6
| 596484 ||  || — || October 27, 2005 || Kitt Peak || Spacewatch || 3:2 || align=right | 3.4 km || 
|-id=485 bgcolor=#d6d6d6
| 596485 ||  || — || October 25, 2005 || Mount Lemmon || Mount Lemmon Survey ||  || align=right | 2.5 km || 
|-id=486 bgcolor=#d6d6d6
| 596486 ||  || — || October 27, 2005 || Mount Lemmon || Mount Lemmon Survey || Tj (2.99) || align=right | 3.4 km || 
|-id=487 bgcolor=#d6d6d6
| 596487 ||  || — || October 28, 2016 || Haleakala || Pan-STARRS ||  || align=right | 2.8 km || 
|-id=488 bgcolor=#E9E9E9
| 596488 ||  || — || May 12, 2012 || Mount Lemmon || Mount Lemmon Survey ||  || align=right data-sort-value="0.58" | 580 m || 
|-id=489 bgcolor=#E9E9E9
| 596489 ||  || — || October 25, 2005 || Kitt Peak || Spacewatch ||  || align=right | 1.7 km || 
|-id=490 bgcolor=#d6d6d6
| 596490 ||  || — || April 11, 2003 || Kitt Peak || Spacewatch || 3:2 || align=right | 4.2 km || 
|-id=491 bgcolor=#d6d6d6
| 596491 ||  || — || October 28, 2005 || Kitt Peak || Spacewatch ||  || align=right | 2.4 km || 
|-id=492 bgcolor=#d6d6d6
| 596492 ||  || — || October 25, 2005 || Mount Lemmon || Mount Lemmon Survey ||  || align=right | 2.6 km || 
|-id=493 bgcolor=#d6d6d6
| 596493 ||  || — || September 23, 2015 || Mount Lemmon || Mount Lemmon Survey ||  || align=right | 2.0 km || 
|-id=494 bgcolor=#d6d6d6
| 596494 ||  || — || October 30, 2005 || Mount Lemmon || Mount Lemmon Survey ||  || align=right | 2.5 km || 
|-id=495 bgcolor=#d6d6d6
| 596495 ||  || — || November 28, 2011 || Mount Lemmon || Mount Lemmon Survey ||  || align=right | 3.0 km || 
|-id=496 bgcolor=#d6d6d6
| 596496 ||  || — || October 31, 2005 || Kitt Peak || Spacewatch ||  || align=right | 2.1 km || 
|-id=497 bgcolor=#d6d6d6
| 596497 ||  || — || October 25, 2005 || Kitt Peak || Spacewatch ||  || align=right | 1.9 km || 
|-id=498 bgcolor=#E9E9E9
| 596498 ||  || — || October 30, 2005 || Kitt Peak || Spacewatch ||  || align=right | 2.3 km || 
|-id=499 bgcolor=#d6d6d6
| 596499 ||  || — || October 25, 2005 || Kitt Peak || Spacewatch || 3:2 || align=right | 4.1 km || 
|-id=500 bgcolor=#E9E9E9
| 596500 ||  || — || October 26, 2005 || Kitt Peak || Spacewatch ||  || align=right data-sort-value="0.69" | 690 m || 
|}

596501–596600 

|-bgcolor=#fefefe
| 596501 ||  || — || October 1, 2005 || Anderson Mesa || LONEOS ||  || align=right data-sort-value="0.81" | 810 m || 
|-id=502 bgcolor=#d6d6d6
| 596502 ||  || — || October 28, 2005 || Kitt Peak || Spacewatch ||  || align=right | 2.0 km || 
|-id=503 bgcolor=#E9E9E9
| 596503 ||  || — || October 26, 2005 || Kitt Peak || Spacewatch ||  || align=right data-sort-value="0.66" | 660 m || 
|-id=504 bgcolor=#fefefe
| 596504 ||  || — || February 15, 2010 || Kitt Peak || Spacewatch ||  || align=right data-sort-value="0.43" | 430 m || 
|-id=505 bgcolor=#fefefe
| 596505 ||  || — || October 28, 2005 || Kitt Peak || Spacewatch ||  || align=right data-sort-value="0.52" | 520 m || 
|-id=506 bgcolor=#d6d6d6
| 596506 ||  || — || October 22, 2005 || Kitt Peak || Spacewatch ||  || align=right | 2.1 km || 
|-id=507 bgcolor=#E9E9E9
| 596507 ||  || — || October 27, 2005 || Mount Lemmon || Mount Lemmon Survey ||  || align=right | 2.1 km || 
|-id=508 bgcolor=#fefefe
| 596508 ||  || — || October 28, 2005 || Kitt Peak || Spacewatch ||  || align=right data-sort-value="0.47" | 470 m || 
|-id=509 bgcolor=#E9E9E9
| 596509 ||  || — || November 4, 2005 || Mount Lemmon || Mount Lemmon Survey ||  || align=right data-sort-value="0.68" | 680 m || 
|-id=510 bgcolor=#d6d6d6
| 596510 ||  || — || November 4, 2005 || Mount Lemmon || Mount Lemmon Survey ||  || align=right | 2.5 km || 
|-id=511 bgcolor=#d6d6d6
| 596511 ||  || — || October 27, 2005 || Mount Lemmon || Mount Lemmon Survey ||  || align=right | 2.0 km || 
|-id=512 bgcolor=#d6d6d6
| 596512 ||  || — || October 22, 2005 || Kitt Peak || Spacewatch ||  || align=right | 2.4 km || 
|-id=513 bgcolor=#E9E9E9
| 596513 ||  || — || November 4, 2005 || Mount Lemmon || Mount Lemmon Survey ||  || align=right data-sort-value="0.92" | 920 m || 
|-id=514 bgcolor=#fefefe
| 596514 ||  || — || October 1, 2005 || Mount Lemmon || Mount Lemmon Survey ||  || align=right data-sort-value="0.63" | 630 m || 
|-id=515 bgcolor=#d6d6d6
| 596515 ||  || — || October 23, 2005 || Apache Point || SDSS Collaboration || SHU3:2 || align=right | 4.5 km || 
|-id=516 bgcolor=#d6d6d6
| 596516 ||  || — || October 27, 2005 || Apache Point || SDSS Collaboration || 3:2 || align=right | 3.5 km || 
|-id=517 bgcolor=#d6d6d6
| 596517 ||  || — || October 30, 2005 || Apache Point || SDSS Collaboration ||  || align=right | 2.2 km || 
|-id=518 bgcolor=#d6d6d6
| 596518 ||  || — || November 12, 2005 || Kitt Peak || Spacewatch ||  || align=right | 1.9 km || 
|-id=519 bgcolor=#d6d6d6
| 596519 ||  || — || November 6, 2005 || Mount Lemmon || Mount Lemmon Survey ||  || align=right | 3.0 km || 
|-id=520 bgcolor=#fefefe
| 596520 ||  || — || February 25, 2011 || Mount Lemmon || Mount Lemmon Survey ||  || align=right data-sort-value="0.74" | 740 m || 
|-id=521 bgcolor=#d6d6d6
| 596521 ||  || — || March 28, 2008 || Kitt Peak || Spacewatch ||  || align=right | 2.6 km || 
|-id=522 bgcolor=#d6d6d6
| 596522 ||  || — || November 3, 2005 || Mount Lemmon || Mount Lemmon Survey ||  || align=right | 2.7 km || 
|-id=523 bgcolor=#E9E9E9
| 596523 ||  || — || September 25, 2008 || Kitt Peak || Spacewatch ||  || align=right | 1.3 km || 
|-id=524 bgcolor=#d6d6d6
| 596524 ||  || — || October 9, 2010 || Mount Lemmon || Mount Lemmon Survey ||  || align=right | 1.8 km || 
|-id=525 bgcolor=#E9E9E9
| 596525 ||  || — || March 16, 2007 || Kitt Peak || Spacewatch ||  || align=right | 1.2 km || 
|-id=526 bgcolor=#d6d6d6
| 596526 ||  || — || April 12, 2008 || Catalina || CSS ||  || align=right | 3.0 km || 
|-id=527 bgcolor=#fefefe
| 596527 ||  || — || November 1, 2005 || Mount Lemmon || Mount Lemmon Survey ||  || align=right data-sort-value="0.75" | 750 m || 
|-id=528 bgcolor=#E9E9E9
| 596528 ||  || — || November 3, 2005 || Mount Lemmon || Mount Lemmon Survey ||  || align=right | 1.2 km || 
|-id=529 bgcolor=#fefefe
| 596529 ||  || — || June 13, 2008 || Kitt Peak || Spacewatch ||  || align=right data-sort-value="0.60" | 600 m || 
|-id=530 bgcolor=#d6d6d6
| 596530 ||  || — || November 7, 2005 || Mauna Kea || Mauna Kea Obs. ||  || align=right | 3.3 km || 
|-id=531 bgcolor=#E9E9E9
| 596531 ||  || — || October 11, 2012 || Haleakala || Pan-STARRS ||  || align=right | 1.1 km || 
|-id=532 bgcolor=#d6d6d6
| 596532 ||  || — || November 5, 2005 || Kitt Peak || Spacewatch ||  || align=right | 2.1 km || 
|-id=533 bgcolor=#d6d6d6
| 596533 ||  || — || November 10, 2005 || Kitt Peak || Spacewatch ||  || align=right | 2.5 km || 
|-id=534 bgcolor=#d6d6d6
| 596534 ||  || — || November 3, 2005 || Mount Lemmon || Mount Lemmon Survey ||  || align=right | 2.3 km || 
|-id=535 bgcolor=#E9E9E9
| 596535 ||  || — || November 6, 2005 || Mount Lemmon || Mount Lemmon Survey ||  || align=right | 1.0 km || 
|-id=536 bgcolor=#E9E9E9
| 596536 ||  || — || November 1, 2005 || Kitt Peak || Spacewatch ||  || align=right | 1.7 km || 
|-id=537 bgcolor=#d6d6d6
| 596537 ||  || — || November 21, 2005 || Kitt Peak || Spacewatch ||  || align=right | 2.3 km || 
|-id=538 bgcolor=#d6d6d6
| 596538 ||  || — || November 22, 2005 || Kitt Peak || Spacewatch ||  || align=right | 2.2 km || 
|-id=539 bgcolor=#d6d6d6
| 596539 ||  || — || November 21, 2005 || Kitt Peak || Spacewatch ||  || align=right | 2.7 km || 
|-id=540 bgcolor=#E9E9E9
| 596540 ||  || — || November 6, 2005 || Mount Lemmon || Mount Lemmon Survey ||  || align=right | 1.4 km || 
|-id=541 bgcolor=#E9E9E9
| 596541 ||  || — || November 22, 2005 || Kitt Peak || Spacewatch ||  || align=right data-sort-value="0.71" | 710 m || 
|-id=542 bgcolor=#E9E9E9
| 596542 ||  || — || November 25, 2005 || Mount Lemmon || Mount Lemmon Survey ||  || align=right | 1.0 km || 
|-id=543 bgcolor=#d6d6d6
| 596543 ||  || — || November 6, 2005 || Nogales || J.-C. Merlin ||  || align=right | 1.5 km || 
|-id=544 bgcolor=#d6d6d6
| 596544 ||  || — || November 25, 2005 || Mount Lemmon || Mount Lemmon Survey ||  || align=right | 2.3 km || 
|-id=545 bgcolor=#E9E9E9
| 596545 ||  || — || November 26, 2005 || Mount Lemmon || Mount Lemmon Survey ||  || align=right data-sort-value="0.57" | 570 m || 
|-id=546 bgcolor=#d6d6d6
| 596546 ||  || — || November 25, 2005 || Kitt Peak || Spacewatch ||  || align=right | 2.5 km || 
|-id=547 bgcolor=#d6d6d6
| 596547 ||  || — || November 25, 2005 || Kitt Peak || Spacewatch ||  || align=right | 2.8 km || 
|-id=548 bgcolor=#E9E9E9
| 596548 ||  || — || November 26, 2005 || Kitt Peak || Spacewatch ||  || align=right data-sort-value="0.88" | 880 m || 
|-id=549 bgcolor=#fefefe
| 596549 ||  || — || November 25, 2005 || Mount Lemmon || Mount Lemmon Survey ||  || align=right data-sort-value="0.89" | 890 m || 
|-id=550 bgcolor=#fefefe
| 596550 ||  || — || October 26, 2005 || Kitt Peak || Spacewatch ||  || align=right data-sort-value="0.65" | 650 m || 
|-id=551 bgcolor=#E9E9E9
| 596551 ||  || — || November 30, 2005 || Mount Lemmon || Mount Lemmon Survey ||  || align=right data-sort-value="0.70" | 700 m || 
|-id=552 bgcolor=#d6d6d6
| 596552 ||  || — || October 12, 2005 || Kitt Peak || Spacewatch ||  || align=right | 2.1 km || 
|-id=553 bgcolor=#d6d6d6
| 596553 ||  || — || November 25, 2005 || Kitt Peak || Spacewatch ||  || align=right | 1.9 km || 
|-id=554 bgcolor=#E9E9E9
| 596554 ||  || — || November 26, 2005 || Mount Lemmon || Mount Lemmon Survey ||  || align=right | 2.3 km || 
|-id=555 bgcolor=#d6d6d6
| 596555 ||  || — || November 26, 2005 || Mount Lemmon || Mount Lemmon Survey ||  || align=right | 2.7 km || 
|-id=556 bgcolor=#fefefe
| 596556 ||  || — || November 29, 2005 || Kitt Peak || Spacewatch ||  || align=right | 1.1 km || 
|-id=557 bgcolor=#E9E9E9
| 596557 ||  || — || November 29, 2005 || Mount Lemmon || Mount Lemmon Survey ||  || align=right data-sort-value="0.95" | 950 m || 
|-id=558 bgcolor=#fefefe
| 596558 ||  || — || August 29, 2001 || Palomar || NEAT ||  || align=right data-sort-value="0.61" | 610 m || 
|-id=559 bgcolor=#d6d6d6
| 596559 ||  || — || October 5, 2005 || Kitt Peak || Spacewatch ||  || align=right | 2.2 km || 
|-id=560 bgcolor=#d6d6d6
| 596560 ||  || — || October 30, 2005 || Mount Lemmon || Mount Lemmon Survey ||  || align=right | 2.3 km || 
|-id=561 bgcolor=#d6d6d6
| 596561 ||  || — || November 6, 2005 || Mount Lemmon || Mount Lemmon Survey ||  || align=right | 3.4 km || 
|-id=562 bgcolor=#d6d6d6
| 596562 ||  || — || November 26, 2005 || Kitt Peak || Spacewatch ||  || align=right | 3.0 km || 
|-id=563 bgcolor=#d6d6d6
| 596563 ||  || — || November 29, 2005 || Kitt Peak || Spacewatch ||  || align=right | 2.5 km || 
|-id=564 bgcolor=#d6d6d6
| 596564 ||  || — || November 30, 2005 || Mount Lemmon || Mount Lemmon Survey ||  || align=right | 2.7 km || 
|-id=565 bgcolor=#d6d6d6
| 596565 ||  || — || November 30, 2005 || Kitt Peak || Spacewatch ||  || align=right | 2.6 km || 
|-id=566 bgcolor=#E9E9E9
| 596566 ||  || — || November 30, 2005 || Kitt Peak || Spacewatch ||  || align=right data-sort-value="0.78" | 780 m || 
|-id=567 bgcolor=#E9E9E9
| 596567 ||  || — || October 23, 2009 || Mount Lemmon || Mount Lemmon Survey ||  || align=right data-sort-value="0.73" | 730 m || 
|-id=568 bgcolor=#fefefe
| 596568 ||  || — || November 29, 2005 || Kitt Peak || Spacewatch ||  || align=right data-sort-value="0.54" | 540 m || 
|-id=569 bgcolor=#d6d6d6
| 596569 ||  || — || March 7, 2013 || Kitt Peak || Spacewatch ||  || align=right | 2.4 km || 
|-id=570 bgcolor=#d6d6d6
| 596570 ||  || — || October 9, 2010 || Mount Lemmon || Mount Lemmon Survey ||  || align=right | 2.8 km || 
|-id=571 bgcolor=#d6d6d6
| 596571 ||  || — || November 26, 2005 || Mount Lemmon || Mount Lemmon Survey ||  || align=right | 2.2 km || 
|-id=572 bgcolor=#E9E9E9
| 596572 ||  || — || March 14, 2011 || Mount Lemmon || Mount Lemmon Survey ||  || align=right data-sort-value="0.67" | 670 m || 
|-id=573 bgcolor=#d6d6d6
| 596573 ||  || — || November 25, 2005 || Kitt Peak || Spacewatch ||  || align=right | 2.0 km || 
|-id=574 bgcolor=#d6d6d6
| 596574 ||  || — || November 30, 2005 || Kitt Peak || Spacewatch ||  || align=right | 2.7 km || 
|-id=575 bgcolor=#E9E9E9
| 596575 ||  || — || November 25, 2005 || Kitt Peak || Spacewatch ||  || align=right | 1.7 km || 
|-id=576 bgcolor=#d6d6d6
| 596576 ||  || — || May 30, 2003 || Cerro Tololo || M. W. Buie, K. J. Meech ||  || align=right | 2.0 km || 
|-id=577 bgcolor=#E9E9E9
| 596577 ||  || — || December 1, 2005 || Kitt Peak || Spacewatch ||  || align=right | 1.2 km || 
|-id=578 bgcolor=#E9E9E9
| 596578 ||  || — || October 28, 2005 || Kitt Peak || Spacewatch ||  || align=right data-sort-value="0.72" | 720 m || 
|-id=579 bgcolor=#d6d6d6
| 596579 ||  || — || December 1, 2005 || Kitt Peak || Spacewatch ||  || align=right | 2.7 km || 
|-id=580 bgcolor=#d6d6d6
| 596580 ||  || — || November 1, 2005 || Mount Lemmon || Mount Lemmon Survey ||  || align=right | 2.6 km || 
|-id=581 bgcolor=#E9E9E9
| 596581 ||  || — || December 1, 2005 || Kitt Peak || Spacewatch ||  || align=right data-sort-value="0.65" | 650 m || 
|-id=582 bgcolor=#d6d6d6
| 596582 ||  || — || December 4, 2005 || Kitt Peak || Spacewatch ||  || align=right | 2.0 km || 
|-id=583 bgcolor=#E9E9E9
| 596583 ||  || — || October 28, 2005 || Kitt Peak || Spacewatch ||  || align=right | 1.2 km || 
|-id=584 bgcolor=#d6d6d6
| 596584 ||  || — || December 2, 2005 || Kitt Peak || Spacewatch ||  || align=right | 3.5 km || 
|-id=585 bgcolor=#d6d6d6
| 596585 ||  || — || December 2, 2005 || Kitt Peak || Spacewatch ||  || align=right | 3.1 km || 
|-id=586 bgcolor=#d6d6d6
| 596586 ||  || — || November 10, 2005 || Mount Lemmon || Mount Lemmon Survey ||  || align=right | 2.8 km || 
|-id=587 bgcolor=#d6d6d6
| 596587 ||  || — || November 27, 2005 || Pla D'Arguines || R. Ferrando, M. Ferrando ||  || align=right | 2.3 km || 
|-id=588 bgcolor=#fefefe
| 596588 Jamesliebert ||  ||  || November 29, 2005 || Catalina || CSS || H || align=right data-sort-value="0.60" | 600 m || 
|-id=589 bgcolor=#E9E9E9
| 596589 ||  || — || December 2, 2005 || Kitt Peak || Spacewatch ||  || align=right data-sort-value="0.71" | 710 m || 
|-id=590 bgcolor=#E9E9E9
| 596590 ||  || — || December 10, 2005 || Kitt Peak || Spacewatch ||  || align=right data-sort-value="0.80" | 800 m || 
|-id=591 bgcolor=#d6d6d6
| 596591 ||  || — || December 6, 2005 || Kitt Peak || Spacewatch ||  || align=right | 2.2 km || 
|-id=592 bgcolor=#d6d6d6
| 596592 ||  || — || December 1, 2005 || Kitt Peak || L. H. Wasserman, R. Millis ||  || align=right | 1.8 km || 
|-id=593 bgcolor=#d6d6d6
| 596593 ||  || — || December 1, 2005 || Kitt Peak || L. H. Wasserman, R. Millis ||  || align=right | 2.1 km || 
|-id=594 bgcolor=#d6d6d6
| 596594 ||  || — || December 1, 2005 || Kitt Peak || L. H. Wasserman, R. Millis ||  || align=right | 2.4 km || 
|-id=595 bgcolor=#E9E9E9
| 596595 ||  || — || December 1, 2005 || Kitt Peak || L. H. Wasserman, R. Millis ||  || align=right data-sort-value="0.96" | 960 m || 
|-id=596 bgcolor=#fefefe
| 596596 ||  || — || December 1, 2005 || Kitt Peak || L. H. Wasserman, R. Millis ||  || align=right data-sort-value="0.43" | 430 m || 
|-id=597 bgcolor=#d6d6d6
| 596597 ||  || — || December 4, 2005 || Mount Lemmon || Mount Lemmon Survey ||  || align=right | 1.9 km || 
|-id=598 bgcolor=#E9E9E9
| 596598 ||  || — || October 8, 2013 || Kitt Peak || Spacewatch ||  || align=right data-sort-value="0.75" | 750 m || 
|-id=599 bgcolor=#d6d6d6
| 596599 ||  || — || December 5, 2005 || Kitt Peak || Spacewatch ||  || align=right | 3.9 km || 
|-id=600 bgcolor=#fefefe
| 596600 ||  || — || November 29, 2005 || Kitt Peak || Spacewatch ||  || align=right data-sort-value="0.50" | 500 m || 
|}

596601–596700 

|-bgcolor=#d6d6d6
| 596601 ||  || — || December 1, 2005 || Kitt Peak || Spacewatch ||  || align=right | 3.6 km || 
|-id=602 bgcolor=#E9E9E9
| 596602 ||  || — || November 25, 2005 || Kitt Peak || Spacewatch ||  || align=right | 1.0 km || 
|-id=603 bgcolor=#d6d6d6
| 596603 ||  || — || December 5, 2005 || Mount Lemmon || Mount Lemmon Survey ||  || align=right | 3.0 km || 
|-id=604 bgcolor=#d6d6d6
| 596604 ||  || — || October 17, 2010 || Mount Lemmon || Mount Lemmon Survey ||  || align=right | 2.7 km || 
|-id=605 bgcolor=#d6d6d6
| 596605 ||  || — || October 8, 2015 || Mount Lemmon || Mount Lemmon Survey ||  || align=right | 2.6 km || 
|-id=606 bgcolor=#d6d6d6
| 596606 ||  || — || January 12, 2018 || Mount Lemmon || Mount Lemmon Survey ||  || align=right | 2.3 km || 
|-id=607 bgcolor=#E9E9E9
| 596607 ||  || — || February 20, 2015 || Haleakala || Pan-STARRS ||  || align=right data-sort-value="0.93" | 930 m || 
|-id=608 bgcolor=#d6d6d6
| 596608 ||  || — || January 23, 2018 || Mount Lemmon || Mount Lemmon Survey ||  || align=right | 2.3 km || 
|-id=609 bgcolor=#d6d6d6
| 596609 ||  || — || July 1, 2014 || Haleakala || Pan-STARRS ||  || align=right | 2.3 km || 
|-id=610 bgcolor=#E9E9E9
| 596610 ||  || — || December 6, 2005 || Kitt Peak || Spacewatch ||  || align=right | 1.1 km || 
|-id=611 bgcolor=#d6d6d6
| 596611 ||  || — || December 1, 2005 || Kitt Peak || Spacewatch ||  || align=right | 2.6 km || 
|-id=612 bgcolor=#E9E9E9
| 596612 ||  || — || March 9, 2007 || Kitt Peak || Spacewatch ||  || align=right data-sort-value="0.75" | 750 m || 
|-id=613 bgcolor=#d6d6d6
| 596613 ||  || — || December 1, 2005 || Kitt Peak || L. H. Wasserman, R. Millis ||  || align=right | 2.1 km || 
|-id=614 bgcolor=#d6d6d6
| 596614 ||  || — || January 26, 2012 || Mount Lemmon || Mount Lemmon Survey ||  || align=right | 2.9 km || 
|-id=615 bgcolor=#E9E9E9
| 596615 ||  || — || August 15, 2013 || Haleakala || Pan-STARRS ||  || align=right | 1.1 km || 
|-id=616 bgcolor=#d6d6d6
| 596616 ||  || — || February 18, 2001 || Haleakala || AMOS ||  || align=right | 3.7 km || 
|-id=617 bgcolor=#d6d6d6
| 596617 ||  || — || December 21, 2005 || Kitt Peak || Spacewatch ||  || align=right | 2.2 km || 
|-id=618 bgcolor=#d6d6d6
| 596618 ||  || — || August 7, 2004 || Palomar || NEAT ||  || align=right | 2.5 km || 
|-id=619 bgcolor=#d6d6d6
| 596619 ||  || — || December 22, 2005 || Kitt Peak || Spacewatch ||  || align=right | 1.6 km || 
|-id=620 bgcolor=#d6d6d6
| 596620 ||  || — || December 24, 2005 || Kitt Peak || Spacewatch ||  || align=right | 2.3 km || 
|-id=621 bgcolor=#d6d6d6
| 596621 ||  || — || December 25, 2005 || Kitt Peak || Spacewatch ||  || align=right | 2.2 km || 
|-id=622 bgcolor=#d6d6d6
| 596622 ||  || — || November 1, 2005 || Mount Lemmon || Mount Lemmon Survey ||  || align=right | 2.4 km || 
|-id=623 bgcolor=#E9E9E9
| 596623 ||  || — || December 25, 2005 || Kitt Peak || Spacewatch ||  || align=right | 1.8 km || 
|-id=624 bgcolor=#E9E9E9
| 596624 ||  || — || December 26, 2005 || Kitt Peak || Spacewatch ||  || align=right data-sort-value="0.69" | 690 m || 
|-id=625 bgcolor=#d6d6d6
| 596625 ||  || — || December 24, 2005 || Kitt Peak || Spacewatch ||  || align=right | 3.2 km || 
|-id=626 bgcolor=#fefefe
| 596626 ||  || — || December 25, 2005 || Mount Lemmon || Mount Lemmon Survey ||  || align=right data-sort-value="0.50" | 500 m || 
|-id=627 bgcolor=#d6d6d6
| 596627 ||  || — || December 26, 2005 || Mount Lemmon || Mount Lemmon Survey ||  || align=right | 2.5 km || 
|-id=628 bgcolor=#E9E9E9
| 596628 ||  || — || December 25, 2005 || Kitt Peak || Spacewatch ||  || align=right | 1.2 km || 
|-id=629 bgcolor=#E9E9E9
| 596629 ||  || — || December 28, 2005 || Kitt Peak || Spacewatch ||  || align=right data-sort-value="0.69" | 690 m || 
|-id=630 bgcolor=#E9E9E9
| 596630 ||  || — || December 25, 2005 || Kitt Peak || Spacewatch ||  || align=right | 1.1 km || 
|-id=631 bgcolor=#d6d6d6
| 596631 ||  || — || December 25, 2005 || Kitt Peak || Spacewatch ||  || align=right | 2.5 km || 
|-id=632 bgcolor=#d6d6d6
| 596632 ||  || — || December 25, 2005 || Mount Lemmon || Mount Lemmon Survey ||  || align=right | 2.7 km || 
|-id=633 bgcolor=#E9E9E9
| 596633 ||  || — || December 26, 2005 || Mount Lemmon || Mount Lemmon Survey ||  || align=right data-sort-value="0.58" | 580 m || 
|-id=634 bgcolor=#E9E9E9
| 596634 ||  || — || December 24, 2005 || Kitt Peak || Spacewatch ||  || align=right data-sort-value="0.71" | 710 m || 
|-id=635 bgcolor=#E9E9E9
| 596635 ||  || — || December 25, 2005 || Kitt Peak || Spacewatch ||  || align=right | 1.3 km || 
|-id=636 bgcolor=#d6d6d6
| 596636 ||  || — || December 27, 2005 || Kitt Peak || Spacewatch ||  || align=right | 2.5 km || 
|-id=637 bgcolor=#d6d6d6
| 596637 ||  || — || December 27, 2005 || Mount Lemmon || Mount Lemmon Survey ||  || align=right | 3.0 km || 
|-id=638 bgcolor=#d6d6d6
| 596638 ||  || — || December 26, 2005 || Mount Lemmon || Mount Lemmon Survey ||  || align=right | 2.6 km || 
|-id=639 bgcolor=#d6d6d6
| 596639 ||  || — || December 23, 2005 || Pla D'Arguines || R. Ferrando, M. Ferrando ||  || align=right | 3.2 km || 
|-id=640 bgcolor=#E9E9E9
| 596640 ||  || — || December 27, 2005 || Kitt Peak || Spacewatch ||  || align=right | 1.8 km || 
|-id=641 bgcolor=#d6d6d6
| 596641 ||  || — || December 27, 2005 || Kitt Peak || Spacewatch ||  || align=right | 2.3 km || 
|-id=642 bgcolor=#fefefe
| 596642 ||  || — || December 27, 2005 || Mount Lemmon || Mount Lemmon Survey ||  || align=right | 1.1 km || 
|-id=643 bgcolor=#d6d6d6
| 596643 ||  || — || December 28, 2005 || Kitt Peak || Spacewatch || THM || align=right | 1.7 km || 
|-id=644 bgcolor=#E9E9E9
| 596644 ||  || — || December 30, 2005 || Kitt Peak || Spacewatch ||  || align=right | 1.9 km || 
|-id=645 bgcolor=#d6d6d6
| 596645 ||  || — || December 6, 2005 || Mount Lemmon || Mount Lemmon Survey ||  || align=right | 3.2 km || 
|-id=646 bgcolor=#d6d6d6
| 596646 ||  || — || December 1, 2005 || Mount Lemmon || Mount Lemmon Survey ||  || align=right | 3.0 km || 
|-id=647 bgcolor=#E9E9E9
| 596647 ||  || — || December 30, 2005 || Kitt Peak || Spacewatch ||  || align=right | 1.5 km || 
|-id=648 bgcolor=#E9E9E9
| 596648 ||  || — || December 25, 2005 || Kitt Peak || Spacewatch ||  || align=right | 1.2 km || 
|-id=649 bgcolor=#fefefe
| 596649 ||  || — || December 25, 2005 || Kitt Peak || Spacewatch ||  || align=right data-sort-value="0.71" | 710 m || 
|-id=650 bgcolor=#E9E9E9
| 596650 ||  || — || December 28, 2005 || Mount Lemmon || Mount Lemmon Survey ||  || align=right | 1.7 km || 
|-id=651 bgcolor=#E9E9E9
| 596651 ||  || — || December 30, 2005 || Kitt Peak || Spacewatch ||  || align=right | 1.1 km || 
|-id=652 bgcolor=#E9E9E9
| 596652 ||  || — || December 30, 2005 || Kitt Peak || Spacewatch ||  || align=right data-sort-value="0.65" | 650 m || 
|-id=653 bgcolor=#E9E9E9
| 596653 ||  || — || December 30, 2005 || Kitt Peak || Spacewatch ||  || align=right | 1.4 km || 
|-id=654 bgcolor=#d6d6d6
| 596654 ||  || — || December 5, 2005 || Kitt Peak || Spacewatch ||  || align=right | 2.6 km || 
|-id=655 bgcolor=#E9E9E9
| 596655 ||  || — || December 29, 2005 || Kitt Peak || Spacewatch ||  || align=right data-sort-value="0.71" | 710 m || 
|-id=656 bgcolor=#d6d6d6
| 596656 ||  || — || December 30, 2005 || Kitt Peak || Spacewatch ||  || align=right | 2.7 km || 
|-id=657 bgcolor=#E9E9E9
| 596657 ||  || — || December 30, 2005 || Kitt Peak || Spacewatch ||  || align=right data-sort-value="0.94" | 940 m || 
|-id=658 bgcolor=#fefefe
| 596658 ||  || — || December 28, 2005 || Mount Lemmon || Mount Lemmon Survey ||  || align=right data-sort-value="0.46" | 460 m || 
|-id=659 bgcolor=#fefefe
| 596659 ||  || — || December 30, 2005 || Kitt Peak || Spacewatch ||  || align=right data-sort-value="0.74" | 740 m || 
|-id=660 bgcolor=#fefefe
| 596660 ||  || — || December 29, 2005 || Mount Lemmon || Mount Lemmon Survey ||  || align=right data-sort-value="0.53" | 530 m || 
|-id=661 bgcolor=#d6d6d6
| 596661 ||  || — || August 12, 2015 || Haleakala || Pan-STARRS ||  || align=right | 2.3 km || 
|-id=662 bgcolor=#d6d6d6
| 596662 ||  || — || December 22, 2005 || Kitt Peak || Spacewatch ||  || align=right | 2.2 km || 
|-id=663 bgcolor=#d6d6d6
| 596663 ||  || — || December 8, 2015 || Haleakala || Pan-STARRS ||  || align=right | 2.4 km || 
|-id=664 bgcolor=#d6d6d6
| 596664 ||  || — || February 17, 2018 || Mount Lemmon || Mount Lemmon Survey ||  || align=right | 2.4 km || 
|-id=665 bgcolor=#E9E9E9
| 596665 ||  || — || December 25, 2005 || Kitt Peak || Spacewatch ||  || align=right data-sort-value="0.99" | 990 m || 
|-id=666 bgcolor=#E9E9E9
| 596666 ||  || — || December 27, 2005 || Kitt Peak || Spacewatch ||  || align=right data-sort-value="0.86" | 860 m || 
|-id=667 bgcolor=#d6d6d6
| 596667 ||  || — || December 29, 2005 || Kitt Peak || Spacewatch ||  || align=right | 2.2 km || 
|-id=668 bgcolor=#d6d6d6
| 596668 ||  || — || December 30, 2005 || Kitt Peak || Spacewatch ||  || align=right | 2.5 km || 
|-id=669 bgcolor=#d6d6d6
| 596669 ||  || — || December 27, 2005 || Kitt Peak || Spacewatch ||  || align=right | 2.1 km || 
|-id=670 bgcolor=#fefefe
| 596670 ||  || — || January 4, 2006 || Kitt Peak || Spacewatch ||  || align=right data-sort-value="0.58" | 580 m || 
|-id=671 bgcolor=#E9E9E9
| 596671 ||  || — || December 5, 2005 || Mount Lemmon || Mount Lemmon Survey ||  || align=right | 1.0 km || 
|-id=672 bgcolor=#E9E9E9
| 596672 ||  || — || December 28, 2005 || Mount Lemmon || Mount Lemmon Survey ||  || align=right data-sort-value="0.70" | 700 m || 
|-id=673 bgcolor=#fefefe
| 596673 ||  || — || April 6, 2003 || Anderson Mesa || LONEOS ||  || align=right data-sort-value="0.61" | 610 m || 
|-id=674 bgcolor=#d6d6d6
| 596674 ||  || — || January 6, 2006 || Mount Lemmon || Mount Lemmon Survey ||  || align=right | 2.6 km || 
|-id=675 bgcolor=#d6d6d6
| 596675 ||  || — || January 7, 2006 || Mount Lemmon || Mount Lemmon Survey || Tj (2.99) || align=right | 3.0 km || 
|-id=676 bgcolor=#fefefe
| 596676 ||  || — || December 25, 2005 || Mount Lemmon || Mount Lemmon Survey ||  || align=right data-sort-value="0.50" | 500 m || 
|-id=677 bgcolor=#E9E9E9
| 596677 ||  || — || January 5, 2006 || Kitt Peak || Spacewatch ||  || align=right | 1.0 km || 
|-id=678 bgcolor=#d6d6d6
| 596678 ||  || — || December 27, 2005 || Kitt Peak || Spacewatch ||  || align=right | 3.1 km || 
|-id=679 bgcolor=#d6d6d6
| 596679 ||  || — || December 28, 2005 || Kitt Peak || Spacewatch ||  || align=right | 2.6 km || 
|-id=680 bgcolor=#E9E9E9
| 596680 ||  || — || September 19, 1995 || Kitt Peak || Spacewatch ||  || align=right | 1.8 km || 
|-id=681 bgcolor=#E9E9E9
| 596681 ||  || — || January 6, 2006 || Kitt Peak || Spacewatch ||  || align=right data-sort-value="0.81" | 810 m || 
|-id=682 bgcolor=#d6d6d6
| 596682 ||  || — || January 8, 2006 || Kitt Peak || Spacewatch ||  || align=right | 2.5 km || 
|-id=683 bgcolor=#E9E9E9
| 596683 ||  || — || January 6, 2006 || Anderson Mesa || LONEOS ||  || align=right | 2.1 km || 
|-id=684 bgcolor=#E9E9E9
| 596684 ||  || — || January 14, 2002 || Kitt Peak || Spacewatch ||  || align=right | 1.4 km || 
|-id=685 bgcolor=#d6d6d6
| 596685 ||  || — || January 7, 2006 || Mount Lemmon || Mount Lemmon Survey ||  || align=right | 2.5 km || 
|-id=686 bgcolor=#E9E9E9
| 596686 ||  || — || January 7, 2006 || Mount Lemmon || Mount Lemmon Survey ||  || align=right data-sort-value="0.68" | 680 m || 
|-id=687 bgcolor=#d6d6d6
| 596687 ||  || — || January 4, 2006 || Mauna Kea || Mauna Kea Obs. ||  || align=right | 3.0 km || 
|-id=688 bgcolor=#d6d6d6
| 596688 ||  || — || January 7, 2006 || Kitt Peak || Spacewatch ||  || align=right | 2.2 km || 
|-id=689 bgcolor=#d6d6d6
| 596689 ||  || — || August 30, 2014 || Haleakala || Pan-STARRS ||  || align=right | 1.8 km || 
|-id=690 bgcolor=#E9E9E9
| 596690 ||  || — || January 7, 2006 || Kitt Peak || Spacewatch ||  || align=right | 2.0 km || 
|-id=691 bgcolor=#d6d6d6
| 596691 ||  || — || December 14, 2010 || Mount Lemmon || Mount Lemmon Survey ||  || align=right | 3.1 km || 
|-id=692 bgcolor=#d6d6d6
| 596692 ||  || — || December 27, 2011 || Mount Lemmon || Mount Lemmon Survey ||  || align=right | 2.4 km || 
|-id=693 bgcolor=#E9E9E9
| 596693 ||  || — || January 5, 2006 || Mount Lemmon || Mount Lemmon Survey ||  || align=right | 1.8 km || 
|-id=694 bgcolor=#E9E9E9
| 596694 ||  || — || January 22, 2006 || Anderson Mesa || LONEOS ||  || align=right | 1.6 km || 
|-id=695 bgcolor=#fefefe
| 596695 ||  || — || January 22, 2006 || Mount Lemmon || Mount Lemmon Survey ||  || align=right data-sort-value="0.68" | 680 m || 
|-id=696 bgcolor=#fefefe
| 596696 ||  || — || January 10, 2006 || Mount Lemmon || Mount Lemmon Survey ||  || align=right data-sort-value="0.74" | 740 m || 
|-id=697 bgcolor=#E9E9E9
| 596697 ||  || — || January 22, 2006 || Mount Lemmon || Mount Lemmon Survey ||  || align=right | 1.9 km || 
|-id=698 bgcolor=#d6d6d6
| 596698 ||  || — || January 8, 2006 || Kitt Peak || Spacewatch ||  || align=right | 2.7 km || 
|-id=699 bgcolor=#d6d6d6
| 596699 ||  || — || January 22, 2006 || Mount Lemmon || Mount Lemmon Survey ||  || align=right | 3.1 km || 
|-id=700 bgcolor=#E9E9E9
| 596700 ||  || — || January 22, 2006 || Mount Lemmon || Mount Lemmon Survey ||  || align=right data-sort-value="0.77" | 770 m || 
|}

596701–596800 

|-bgcolor=#d6d6d6
| 596701 ||  || — || January 23, 2006 || Kitt Peak || Spacewatch ||  || align=right | 2.2 km || 
|-id=702 bgcolor=#d6d6d6
| 596702 ||  || — || January 23, 2006 || Kitt Peak || Spacewatch ||  || align=right | 2.1 km || 
|-id=703 bgcolor=#d6d6d6
| 596703 ||  || — || January 23, 2006 || Kitt Peak || Spacewatch ||  || align=right | 2.2 km || 
|-id=704 bgcolor=#d6d6d6
| 596704 ||  || — || January 23, 2006 || Mount Lemmon || Mount Lemmon Survey ||  || align=right | 2.1 km || 
|-id=705 bgcolor=#d6d6d6
| 596705 ||  || — || January 26, 2006 || Kitt Peak || Spacewatch ||  || align=right | 2.2 km || 
|-id=706 bgcolor=#d6d6d6
| 596706 ||  || — || October 24, 2005 || Mauna Kea || Mauna Kea Obs. ||  || align=right | 4.6 km || 
|-id=707 bgcolor=#C2FFFF
| 596707 ||  || — || January 26, 2006 || Kitt Peak || Spacewatch || L5 || align=right | 7.0 km || 
|-id=708 bgcolor=#d6d6d6
| 596708 ||  || — || January 7, 2006 || Kitt Peak || Spacewatch ||  || align=right | 2.6 km || 
|-id=709 bgcolor=#d6d6d6
| 596709 ||  || — || January 26, 2006 || Mount Lemmon || Mount Lemmon Survey ||  || align=right | 2.4 km || 
|-id=710 bgcolor=#fefefe
| 596710 ||  || — || January 27, 2006 || Mount Lemmon || Mount Lemmon Survey ||  || align=right data-sort-value="0.58" | 580 m || 
|-id=711 bgcolor=#fefefe
| 596711 ||  || — || April 8, 2003 || Kitt Peak || Spacewatch ||  || align=right data-sort-value="0.67" | 670 m || 
|-id=712 bgcolor=#E9E9E9
| 596712 ||  || — || January 25, 2006 || Kitt Peak || Spacewatch ||  || align=right | 1.2 km || 
|-id=713 bgcolor=#E9E9E9
| 596713 ||  || — || January 25, 2006 || Kitt Peak || Spacewatch ||  || align=right | 1.3 km || 
|-id=714 bgcolor=#d6d6d6
| 596714 ||  || — || January 27, 2006 || Kitt Peak || Spacewatch ||  || align=right | 1.9 km || 
|-id=715 bgcolor=#d6d6d6
| 596715 ||  || — || January 8, 2006 || Mount Lemmon || Mount Lemmon Survey ||  || align=right | 2.5 km || 
|-id=716 bgcolor=#d6d6d6
| 596716 ||  || — || January 27, 2006 || Kitt Peak || Spacewatch ||  || align=right | 2.4 km || 
|-id=717 bgcolor=#E9E9E9
| 596717 ||  || — || January 27, 2006 || Kitt Peak || Spacewatch ||  || align=right | 1.2 km || 
|-id=718 bgcolor=#E9E9E9
| 596718 ||  || — || March 5, 2002 || Kitt Peak || Spacewatch ||  || align=right data-sort-value="0.91" | 910 m || 
|-id=719 bgcolor=#fefefe
| 596719 ||  || — || January 28, 2006 || Mount Lemmon || Mount Lemmon Survey ||  || align=right data-sort-value="0.55" | 550 m || 
|-id=720 bgcolor=#fefefe
| 596720 ||  || — || November 7, 2005 || Mauna Kea || Mauna Kea Obs. ||  || align=right data-sort-value="0.57" | 570 m || 
|-id=721 bgcolor=#E9E9E9
| 596721 ||  || — || January 30, 2006 || Kitt Peak || Spacewatch ||  || align=right data-sort-value="0.82" | 820 m || 
|-id=722 bgcolor=#E9E9E9
| 596722 ||  || — || January 30, 2006 || Kitt Peak || Spacewatch ||  || align=right data-sort-value="0.96" | 960 m || 
|-id=723 bgcolor=#FA8072
| 596723 ||  || — || January 30, 2006 || Kitt Peak || Spacewatch ||  || align=right data-sort-value="0.41" | 410 m || 
|-id=724 bgcolor=#E9E9E9
| 596724 ||  || — || January 31, 2006 || Kitt Peak || Spacewatch ||  || align=right | 1.7 km || 
|-id=725 bgcolor=#E9E9E9
| 596725 ||  || — || January 31, 2006 || Kitt Peak || Spacewatch ||  || align=right | 1.3 km || 
|-id=726 bgcolor=#E9E9E9
| 596726 ||  || — || January 5, 2006 || Mount Lemmon || Mount Lemmon Survey || ADE || align=right | 1.9 km || 
|-id=727 bgcolor=#E9E9E9
| 596727 ||  || — || March 6, 2011 || Mount Lemmon || Mount Lemmon Survey ||  || align=right | 2.0 km || 
|-id=728 bgcolor=#E9E9E9
| 596728 ||  || — || January 31, 2006 || Mount Lemmon || Mount Lemmon Survey ||  || align=right | 1.3 km || 
|-id=729 bgcolor=#E9E9E9
| 596729 ||  || — || January 28, 2006 || Mount Lemmon || Mount Lemmon Survey ||  || align=right | 1.6 km || 
|-id=730 bgcolor=#d6d6d6
| 596730 ||  || — || January 30, 2006 || Kitt Peak || Spacewatch ||  || align=right | 2.2 km || 
|-id=731 bgcolor=#d6d6d6
| 596731 ||  || — || January 31, 2006 || Kitt Peak || Spacewatch ||  || align=right | 1.8 km || 
|-id=732 bgcolor=#E9E9E9
| 596732 ||  || — || August 21, 2004 || Siding Spring || SSS ||  || align=right | 1.1 km || 
|-id=733 bgcolor=#E9E9E9
| 596733 ||  || — || January 31, 2006 || Kitt Peak || Spacewatch ||  || align=right | 1.2 km || 
|-id=734 bgcolor=#E9E9E9
| 596734 ||  || — || January 31, 2006 || Kitt Peak || Spacewatch ||  || align=right | 1.6 km || 
|-id=735 bgcolor=#d6d6d6
| 596735 ||  || — || January 23, 2006 || Kitt Peak || Spacewatch ||  || align=right | 2.7 km || 
|-id=736 bgcolor=#E9E9E9
| 596736 ||  || — || January 31, 2006 || Kitt Peak || Spacewatch ||  || align=right | 1.3 km || 
|-id=737 bgcolor=#d6d6d6
| 596737 ||  || — || January 31, 2006 || Kitt Peak || Spacewatch ||  || align=right | 3.0 km || 
|-id=738 bgcolor=#d6d6d6
| 596738 ||  || — || November 7, 2005 || Mauna Kea || Mauna Kea Obs. ||  || align=right | 1.8 km || 
|-id=739 bgcolor=#d6d6d6
| 596739 ||  || — || January 31, 2006 || Kitt Peak || Spacewatch ||  || align=right | 2.1 km || 
|-id=740 bgcolor=#d6d6d6
| 596740 ||  || — || January 23, 2006 || Kitt Peak || Spacewatch ||  || align=right | 3.0 km || 
|-id=741 bgcolor=#E9E9E9
| 596741 ||  || — || January 23, 2006 || Kitt Peak || Spacewatch ||  || align=right | 1.3 km || 
|-id=742 bgcolor=#E9E9E9
| 596742 ||  || — || January 31, 2006 || Kitt Peak || Spacewatch ||  || align=right | 1.4 km || 
|-id=743 bgcolor=#E9E9E9
| 596743 ||  || — || January 30, 2006 || Kitt Peak || Spacewatch ||  || align=right data-sort-value="0.80" | 800 m || 
|-id=744 bgcolor=#E9E9E9
| 596744 ||  || — || April 18, 2015 || Haleakala || Pan-STARRS ||  || align=right | 1.0 km || 
|-id=745 bgcolor=#d6d6d6
| 596745 ||  || — || December 28, 2011 || Mount Lemmon || Mount Lemmon Survey ||  || align=right | 2.7 km || 
|-id=746 bgcolor=#d6d6d6
| 596746 ||  || — || July 25, 2015 || Haleakala || Pan-STARRS ||  || align=right | 2.4 km || 
|-id=747 bgcolor=#fefefe
| 596747 ||  || — || January 31, 2006 || Kitt Peak || Spacewatch ||  || align=right data-sort-value="0.50" | 500 m || 
|-id=748 bgcolor=#d6d6d6
| 596748 ||  || — || September 26, 2003 || Apache Point || SDSS Collaboration ||  || align=right | 2.4 km || 
|-id=749 bgcolor=#fefefe
| 596749 ||  || — || January 30, 2006 || Kitt Peak || Spacewatch ||  || align=right data-sort-value="0.61" | 610 m || 
|-id=750 bgcolor=#d6d6d6
| 596750 ||  || — || January 23, 2006 || Mount Lemmon || Mount Lemmon Survey ||  || align=right | 2.2 km || 
|-id=751 bgcolor=#d6d6d6
| 596751 ||  || — || January 21, 2006 || Mount Lemmon || Mount Lemmon Survey ||  || align=right | 2.1 km || 
|-id=752 bgcolor=#d6d6d6
| 596752 ||  || — || February 1, 2006 || Mount Lemmon || Mount Lemmon Survey ||  || align=right | 2.6 km || 
|-id=753 bgcolor=#d6d6d6
| 596753 ||  || — || February 1, 2006 || Mount Lemmon || Mount Lemmon Survey ||  || align=right | 3.0 km || 
|-id=754 bgcolor=#d6d6d6
| 596754 ||  || — || February 1, 2006 || Kitt Peak || Spacewatch ||  || align=right | 3.8 km || 
|-id=755 bgcolor=#E9E9E9
| 596755 ||  || — || February 1, 2006 || Mount Lemmon || Mount Lemmon Survey ||  || align=right data-sort-value="0.81" | 810 m || 
|-id=756 bgcolor=#E9E9E9
| 596756 ||  || — || February 1, 2006 || Mount Lemmon || Mount Lemmon Survey ||  || align=right | 1.4 km || 
|-id=757 bgcolor=#d6d6d6
| 596757 ||  || — || February 1, 2006 || Mount Lemmon || Mount Lemmon Survey ||  || align=right | 2.8 km || 
|-id=758 bgcolor=#d6d6d6
| 596758 ||  || — || January 22, 2006 || Mount Lemmon || Mount Lemmon Survey ||  || align=right | 1.7 km || 
|-id=759 bgcolor=#E9E9E9
| 596759 ||  || — || February 2, 2006 || Kitt Peak || Spacewatch ||  || align=right | 1.2 km || 
|-id=760 bgcolor=#E9E9E9
| 596760 ||  || — || February 2, 2006 || Mount Lemmon || Mount Lemmon Survey ||  || align=right | 1.3 km || 
|-id=761 bgcolor=#d6d6d6
| 596761 ||  || — || January 30, 2006 || Kitt Peak || Spacewatch ||  || align=right | 2.1 km || 
|-id=762 bgcolor=#fefefe
| 596762 ||  || — || February 4, 2006 || Kitt Peak || Spacewatch ||  || align=right data-sort-value="0.56" | 560 m || 
|-id=763 bgcolor=#E9E9E9
| 596763 ||  || — || February 4, 2006 || Kitt Peak || Spacewatch ||  || align=right data-sort-value="0.85" | 850 m || 
|-id=764 bgcolor=#E9E9E9
| 596764 ||  || — || January 30, 2006 || Kitt Peak || Spacewatch ||  || align=right | 1.1 km || 
|-id=765 bgcolor=#d6d6d6
| 596765 ||  || — || February 2, 2006 || Mauna Kea || Mauna Kea Obs. ||  || align=right | 2.3 km || 
|-id=766 bgcolor=#fefefe
| 596766 ||  || — || September 18, 2010 || Mount Lemmon || Mount Lemmon Survey || H || align=right data-sort-value="0.58" | 580 m || 
|-id=767 bgcolor=#E9E9E9
| 596767 ||  || — || August 21, 2012 || Crni Vrh || H. Mikuž ||  || align=right | 1.4 km || 
|-id=768 bgcolor=#E9E9E9
| 596768 ||  || — || November 29, 2013 || Haleakala || Pan-STARRS ||  || align=right data-sort-value="0.89" | 890 m || 
|-id=769 bgcolor=#d6d6d6
| 596769 ||  || — || July 3, 2014 || Haleakala || Pan-STARRS ||  || align=right | 2.5 km || 
|-id=770 bgcolor=#E9E9E9
| 596770 ||  || — || October 10, 2016 || Mount Lemmon || Mount Lemmon Survey ||  || align=right | 1.3 km || 
|-id=771 bgcolor=#fefefe
| 596771 ||  || — || March 19, 2013 || Haleakala || Pan-STARRS ||  || align=right data-sort-value="0.45" | 450 m || 
|-id=772 bgcolor=#E9E9E9
| 596772 ||  || — || December 27, 2014 || Haleakala || Pan-STARRS ||  || align=right | 1.1 km || 
|-id=773 bgcolor=#E9E9E9
| 596773 ||  || — || March 5, 2016 || Haleakala || Pan-STARRS ||  || align=right | 2.1 km || 
|-id=774 bgcolor=#d6d6d6
| 596774 ||  || — || May 31, 2013 || Haleakala || Pan-STARRS ||  || align=right | 3.2 km || 
|-id=775 bgcolor=#E9E9E9
| 596775 ||  || — || February 4, 2006 || Kitt Peak || Spacewatch ||  || align=right | 1.1 km || 
|-id=776 bgcolor=#E9E9E9
| 596776 ||  || — || September 17, 2017 || Haleakala || Pan-STARRS ||  || align=right | 1.3 km || 
|-id=777 bgcolor=#d6d6d6
| 596777 ||  || — || February 1, 2006 || Kitt Peak || Spacewatch ||  || align=right | 2.4 km || 
|-id=778 bgcolor=#E9E9E9
| 596778 ||  || — || July 4, 2016 || Haleakala || Pan-STARRS ||  || align=right | 1.4 km || 
|-id=779 bgcolor=#d6d6d6
| 596779 ||  || — || June 7, 2013 || Haleakala || Pan-STARRS ||  || align=right | 2.4 km || 
|-id=780 bgcolor=#E9E9E9
| 596780 ||  || — || February 1, 2006 || Kitt Peak || Spacewatch ||  || align=right | 1.0 km || 
|-id=781 bgcolor=#E9E9E9
| 596781 ||  || — || January 30, 2006 || Catalina || CSS ||  || align=right | 1.3 km || 
|-id=782 bgcolor=#fefefe
| 596782 ||  || — || February 20, 2006 || Marly || P. Kocher || H || align=right data-sort-value="0.73" | 730 m || 
|-id=783 bgcolor=#E9E9E9
| 596783 ||  || — || February 20, 2006 || Kitt Peak || Spacewatch ||  || align=right | 1.2 km || 
|-id=784 bgcolor=#fefefe
| 596784 ||  || — || December 2, 2005 || Kitt Peak || L. H. Wasserman, R. Millis ||  || align=right data-sort-value="0.50" | 500 m || 
|-id=785 bgcolor=#E9E9E9
| 596785 ||  || — || February 23, 2006 || Anderson Mesa || LONEOS ||  || align=right | 1.0 km || 
|-id=786 bgcolor=#fefefe
| 596786 ||  || — || January 31, 2006 || Kitt Peak || Spacewatch ||  || align=right data-sort-value="0.68" | 680 m || 
|-id=787 bgcolor=#d6d6d6
| 596787 ||  || — || February 20, 2006 || Kitt Peak || Spacewatch ||  || align=right | 1.9 km || 
|-id=788 bgcolor=#E9E9E9
| 596788 ||  || — || February 2, 2006 || Mount Lemmon || Mount Lemmon Survey ||  || align=right | 1.1 km || 
|-id=789 bgcolor=#fefefe
| 596789 ||  || — || February 24, 2006 || Kitt Peak || Spacewatch ||  || align=right data-sort-value="0.49" | 490 m || 
|-id=790 bgcolor=#E9E9E9
| 596790 ||  || — || January 26, 2006 || Kitt Peak || Spacewatch ||  || align=right | 1.1 km || 
|-id=791 bgcolor=#C2FFFF
| 596791 ||  || — || December 3, 2005 || Mauna Kea || Mauna Kea Obs. || L5 || align=right | 10 km || 
|-id=792 bgcolor=#E9E9E9
| 596792 ||  || — || February 24, 2006 || Kitt Peak || Spacewatch ||  || align=right | 1.6 km || 
|-id=793 bgcolor=#d6d6d6
| 596793 ||  || — || February 25, 2006 || Mount Lemmon || Mount Lemmon Survey || 7:4 || align=right | 2.4 km || 
|-id=794 bgcolor=#E9E9E9
| 596794 ||  || — || September 27, 2003 || Kitt Peak || Spacewatch ||  || align=right | 1.1 km || 
|-id=795 bgcolor=#fefefe
| 596795 ||  || — || February 25, 2006 || Kitt Peak || Spacewatch ||  || align=right data-sort-value="0.60" | 600 m || 
|-id=796 bgcolor=#C2FFFF
| 596796 ||  || — || February 27, 2006 || Catalina || CSS || L5 || align=right | 11 km || 
|-id=797 bgcolor=#E9E9E9
| 596797 ||  || — || February 25, 2006 || Kitt Peak || Spacewatch ||  || align=right data-sort-value="0.96" | 960 m || 
|-id=798 bgcolor=#E9E9E9
| 596798 ||  || — || February 24, 2006 || Kitt Peak || Spacewatch ||  || align=right | 1.2 km || 
|-id=799 bgcolor=#fefefe
| 596799 ||  || — || February 25, 2006 || Kitt Peak || Spacewatch ||  || align=right data-sort-value="0.51" | 510 m || 
|-id=800 bgcolor=#d6d6d6
| 596800 ||  || — || February 25, 2006 || Mount Lemmon || Mount Lemmon Survey ||  || align=right | 2.1 km || 
|}

596801–596900 

|-bgcolor=#C2FFFF
| 596801 ||  || — || February 25, 2006 || Kitt Peak || Spacewatch || L5 || align=right | 6.8 km || 
|-id=802 bgcolor=#E9E9E9
| 596802 ||  || — || December 3, 2005 || Mauna Kea || Mauna Kea Obs. ||  || align=right | 1.9 km || 
|-id=803 bgcolor=#E9E9E9
| 596803 ||  || — || February 25, 2006 || Kitt Peak || Spacewatch ||  || align=right | 1.1 km || 
|-id=804 bgcolor=#E9E9E9
| 596804 ||  || — || February 25, 2006 || Mount Lemmon || Mount Lemmon Survey || EUN || align=right data-sort-value="0.79" | 790 m || 
|-id=805 bgcolor=#E9E9E9
| 596805 ||  || — || February 25, 2006 || Kitt Peak || Spacewatch ||  || align=right | 1.4 km || 
|-id=806 bgcolor=#E9E9E9
| 596806 ||  || — || February 27, 2006 || Kitt Peak || Spacewatch ||  || align=right | 1.2 km || 
|-id=807 bgcolor=#d6d6d6
| 596807 ||  || — || February 27, 2006 || Kitt Peak || Spacewatch ||  || align=right | 2.6 km || 
|-id=808 bgcolor=#E9E9E9
| 596808 ||  || — || February 27, 2006 || Kitt Peak || Spacewatch ||  || align=right | 1.4 km || 
|-id=809 bgcolor=#E9E9E9
| 596809 ||  || — || February 27, 2006 || Kitt Peak || Spacewatch ||  || align=right | 1.6 km || 
|-id=810 bgcolor=#E9E9E9
| 596810 ||  || — || February 27, 2006 || Mount Lemmon || Mount Lemmon Survey ||  || align=right | 1.1 km || 
|-id=811 bgcolor=#E9E9E9
| 596811 ||  || — || February 27, 2006 || Kitt Peak || Spacewatch ||  || align=right | 1.2 km || 
|-id=812 bgcolor=#fefefe
| 596812 ||  || — || February 27, 2006 || Kitt Peak || Spacewatch ||  || align=right data-sort-value="0.59" | 590 m || 
|-id=813 bgcolor=#d6d6d6
| 596813 ||  || — || February 27, 2006 || Kitt Peak || Spacewatch ||  || align=right | 3.0 km || 
|-id=814 bgcolor=#d6d6d6
| 596814 ||  || — || February 20, 2006 || Kitt Peak || Spacewatch ||  || align=right | 2.6 km || 
|-id=815 bgcolor=#fefefe
| 596815 ||  || — || February 27, 2006 || Kitt Peak || Spacewatch ||  || align=right data-sort-value="0.53" | 530 m || 
|-id=816 bgcolor=#fefefe
| 596816 ||  || — || February 4, 2006 || Kitt Peak || Spacewatch ||  || align=right data-sort-value="0.63" | 630 m || 
|-id=817 bgcolor=#E9E9E9
| 596817 ||  || — || February 5, 2006 || Mount Lemmon || Mount Lemmon Survey ||  || align=right | 1.9 km || 
|-id=818 bgcolor=#E9E9E9
| 596818 ||  || — || February 24, 2006 || Kitt Peak || Spacewatch ||  || align=right | 1.7 km || 
|-id=819 bgcolor=#E9E9E9
| 596819 ||  || — || February 27, 2006 || Mount Lemmon || Mount Lemmon Survey ||  || align=right | 1.0 km || 
|-id=820 bgcolor=#E9E9E9
| 596820 ||  || — || October 8, 2008 || Kitt Peak || Spacewatch ||  || align=right | 1.4 km || 
|-id=821 bgcolor=#E9E9E9
| 596821 ||  || — || February 25, 2006 || Kitt Peak || Spacewatch ||  || align=right | 1.0 km || 
|-id=822 bgcolor=#E9E9E9
| 596822 ||  || — || February 27, 2006 || Mount Lemmon || Mount Lemmon Survey ||  || align=right | 1.8 km || 
|-id=823 bgcolor=#E9E9E9
| 596823 ||  || — || October 8, 2008 || Kitt Peak || Spacewatch ||  || align=right | 1.1 km || 
|-id=824 bgcolor=#E9E9E9
| 596824 ||  || — || July 17, 2016 || Haleakala || Pan-STARRS ||  || align=right | 1.0 km || 
|-id=825 bgcolor=#E9E9E9
| 596825 ||  || — || February 25, 2006 || Kitt Peak || Spacewatch ||  || align=right | 1.2 km || 
|-id=826 bgcolor=#E9E9E9
| 596826 ||  || — || March 2, 2006 || Kitt Peak || Spacewatch ||  || align=right | 1.2 km || 
|-id=827 bgcolor=#E9E9E9
| 596827 ||  || — || October 28, 1995 || Kitt Peak || Spacewatch ||  || align=right | 1.7 km || 
|-id=828 bgcolor=#fefefe
| 596828 ||  || — || March 2, 2006 || Kitt Peak || Spacewatch ||  || align=right data-sort-value="0.43" | 430 m || 
|-id=829 bgcolor=#E9E9E9
| 596829 ||  || — || October 1, 2003 || Kitt Peak || Spacewatch ||  || align=right | 1.4 km || 
|-id=830 bgcolor=#E9E9E9
| 596830 ||  || — || March 3, 2006 || Kitt Peak || Spacewatch ||  || align=right | 1.6 km || 
|-id=831 bgcolor=#d6d6d6
| 596831 ||  || — || January 31, 2006 || Kitt Peak || Spacewatch ||  || align=right | 2.1 km || 
|-id=832 bgcolor=#fefefe
| 596832 ||  || — || March 3, 2006 || Kitt Peak || Spacewatch ||  || align=right data-sort-value="0.42" | 420 m || 
|-id=833 bgcolor=#d6d6d6
| 596833 ||  || — || January 30, 2006 || Kitt Peak || Spacewatch ||  || align=right | 2.2 km || 
|-id=834 bgcolor=#E9E9E9
| 596834 ||  || — || February 20, 2006 || Mount Lemmon || Mount Lemmon Survey ||  || align=right | 1.3 km || 
|-id=835 bgcolor=#E9E9E9
| 596835 ||  || — || March 3, 2006 || Kitt Peak || Spacewatch ||  || align=right | 1.4 km || 
|-id=836 bgcolor=#fefefe
| 596836 ||  || — || March 3, 2006 || Kitt Peak || Spacewatch ||  || align=right data-sort-value="0.51" | 510 m || 
|-id=837 bgcolor=#E9E9E9
| 596837 ||  || — || March 3, 2006 || Kitt Peak || Spacewatch ||  || align=right | 1.3 km || 
|-id=838 bgcolor=#E9E9E9
| 596838 ||  || — || March 3, 2006 || Mount Lemmon || Mount Lemmon Survey ||  || align=right data-sort-value="0.99" | 990 m || 
|-id=839 bgcolor=#E9E9E9
| 596839 ||  || — || March 4, 2006 || Kitt Peak || Spacewatch ||  || align=right | 1.1 km || 
|-id=840 bgcolor=#E9E9E9
| 596840 ||  || — || February 24, 2006 || Mount Lemmon || Mount Lemmon Survey ||  || align=right data-sort-value="0.91" | 910 m || 
|-id=841 bgcolor=#fefefe
| 596841 ||  || — || May 6, 2003 || Kitt Peak || Spacewatch ||  || align=right data-sort-value="0.59" | 590 m || 
|-id=842 bgcolor=#E9E9E9
| 596842 ||  || — || March 5, 2006 || Kitt Peak || Spacewatch ||  || align=right | 2.2 km || 
|-id=843 bgcolor=#E9E9E9
| 596843 ||  || — || March 5, 2006 || Kitt Peak || Spacewatch ||  || align=right | 1.0 km || 
|-id=844 bgcolor=#E9E9E9
| 596844 ||  || — || February 25, 2006 || Mount Lemmon || Mount Lemmon Survey ||  || align=right data-sort-value="0.98" | 980 m || 
|-id=845 bgcolor=#d6d6d6
| 596845 ||  || — || February 4, 2006 || Kitt Peak || Spacewatch ||  || align=right | 2.3 km || 
|-id=846 bgcolor=#E9E9E9
| 596846 ||  || — || March 3, 2006 || Kitt Peak || Spacewatch ||  || align=right | 1.1 km || 
|-id=847 bgcolor=#E9E9E9
| 596847 ||  || — || July 6, 2003 || Kitt Peak || Spacewatch ||  || align=right data-sort-value="0.99" | 990 m || 
|-id=848 bgcolor=#fefefe
| 596848 ||  || — || September 9, 2007 || Kitt Peak || Spacewatch ||  || align=right data-sort-value="0.66" | 660 m || 
|-id=849 bgcolor=#d6d6d6
| 596849 ||  || — || September 9, 2015 || Haleakala || Pan-STARRS ||  || align=right | 2.1 km || 
|-id=850 bgcolor=#E9E9E9
| 596850 ||  || — || October 5, 2012 || Haleakala || Pan-STARRS ||  || align=right | 1.3 km || 
|-id=851 bgcolor=#E9E9E9
| 596851 ||  || — || December 23, 2017 || Haleakala || Pan-STARRS ||  || align=right data-sort-value="0.72" | 720 m || 
|-id=852 bgcolor=#d6d6d6
| 596852 ||  || — || February 16, 2012 || Haleakala || Pan-STARRS || 7:4 || align=right | 2.3 km || 
|-id=853 bgcolor=#E9E9E9
| 596853 ||  || — || March 2, 2006 || Kitt Peak || Spacewatch ||  || align=right | 1.1 km || 
|-id=854 bgcolor=#C2FFFF
| 596854 ||  || — || March 4, 2006 || Kitt Peak || Spacewatch || L5 || align=right | 6.1 km || 
|-id=855 bgcolor=#fefefe
| 596855 ||  || — || March 23, 2006 || Mount Lemmon || Mount Lemmon Survey ||  || align=right data-sort-value="0.59" | 590 m || 
|-id=856 bgcolor=#E9E9E9
| 596856 ||  || — || March 24, 2006 || Mount Lemmon || Mount Lemmon Survey ||  || align=right | 1.1 km || 
|-id=857 bgcolor=#E9E9E9
| 596857 ||  || — || March 24, 2006 || Mount Lemmon || Mount Lemmon Survey ||  || align=right | 1.1 km || 
|-id=858 bgcolor=#E9E9E9
| 596858 ||  || — || March 24, 2006 || Mount Lemmon || Mount Lemmon Survey ||  || align=right | 1.3 km || 
|-id=859 bgcolor=#E9E9E9
| 596859 ||  || — || March 25, 2006 || Mount Lemmon || Mount Lemmon Survey ||  || align=right | 1.2 km || 
|-id=860 bgcolor=#fefefe
| 596860 ||  || — || March 2, 2006 || Catalina || CSS || H || align=right data-sort-value="0.83" | 830 m || 
|-id=861 bgcolor=#fefefe
| 596861 ||  || — || March 26, 2006 || Mount Lemmon || Mount Lemmon Survey ||  || align=right data-sort-value="0.56" | 560 m || 
|-id=862 bgcolor=#d6d6d6
| 596862 ||  || — || February 26, 2012 || Mount Lemmon || Mount Lemmon Survey ||  || align=right | 2.9 km || 
|-id=863 bgcolor=#E9E9E9
| 596863 ||  || — || March 3, 2006 || Kitt Peak || Spacewatch ||  || align=right data-sort-value="0.83" | 830 m || 
|-id=864 bgcolor=#fefefe
| 596864 ||  || — || December 6, 2008 || Kitt Peak || Spacewatch ||  || align=right data-sort-value="0.62" | 620 m || 
|-id=865 bgcolor=#fefefe
| 596865 ||  || — || January 3, 2009 || Mount Lemmon || Mount Lemmon Survey ||  || align=right data-sort-value="0.58" | 580 m || 
|-id=866 bgcolor=#E9E9E9
| 596866 ||  || — || March 26, 2006 || Kitt Peak || Spacewatch ||  || align=right | 1.8 km || 
|-id=867 bgcolor=#E9E9E9
| 596867 ||  || — || March 26, 2006 || Mount Lemmon || Mount Lemmon Survey ||  || align=right | 1.5 km || 
|-id=868 bgcolor=#E9E9E9
| 596868 ||  || — || March 24, 2006 || Mount Lemmon || Mount Lemmon Survey ||  || align=right | 1.5 km || 
|-id=869 bgcolor=#fefefe
| 596869 ||  || — || April 2, 2006 || Kitt Peak || Spacewatch || H || align=right data-sort-value="0.48" | 480 m || 
|-id=870 bgcolor=#E9E9E9
| 596870 ||  || — || April 2, 2006 || Kitt Peak || Spacewatch ||  || align=right | 1.1 km || 
|-id=871 bgcolor=#d6d6d6
| 596871 ||  || — || April 2, 2006 || Kitt Peak || Spacewatch ||  || align=right | 2.1 km || 
|-id=872 bgcolor=#E9E9E9
| 596872 ||  || — || April 2, 2006 || Kitt Peak || Spacewatch ||  || align=right | 1.3 km || 
|-id=873 bgcolor=#fefefe
| 596873 ||  || — || April 2, 2006 || Kitt Peak || Spacewatch ||  || align=right data-sort-value="0.76" | 760 m || 
|-id=874 bgcolor=#E9E9E9
| 596874 ||  || — || March 4, 2006 || Kitt Peak || Spacewatch ||  || align=right data-sort-value="0.98" | 980 m || 
|-id=875 bgcolor=#E9E9E9
| 596875 ||  || — || November 30, 2008 || Kitt Peak || Spacewatch ||  || align=right | 1.3 km || 
|-id=876 bgcolor=#d6d6d6
| 596876 ||  || — || March 4, 2006 || Kitt Peak || Spacewatch ||  || align=right | 3.6 km || 
|-id=877 bgcolor=#E9E9E9
| 596877 ||  || — || August 3, 2016 || Haleakala || Pan-STARRS ||  || align=right | 1.3 km || 
|-id=878 bgcolor=#E9E9E9
| 596878 ||  || — || April 25, 2015 || Haleakala || Pan-STARRS ||  || align=right | 1.3 km || 
|-id=879 bgcolor=#E9E9E9
| 596879 ||  || — || April 19, 2006 || Kitt Peak || Spacewatch ||  || align=right | 1.1 km || 
|-id=880 bgcolor=#E9E9E9
| 596880 ||  || — || April 20, 2006 || Kitt Peak || Spacewatch ||  || align=right | 1.6 km || 
|-id=881 bgcolor=#E9E9E9
| 596881 ||  || — || April 24, 2006 || Calvin-Rehoboth || L. A. Molnar ||  || align=right | 1.4 km || 
|-id=882 bgcolor=#E9E9E9
| 596882 ||  || — || April 21, 2006 || Kitt Peak || Spacewatch ||  || align=right | 1.5 km || 
|-id=883 bgcolor=#E9E9E9
| 596883 ||  || — || March 2, 2006 || Mount Lemmon || Mount Lemmon Survey ||  || align=right | 1.3 km || 
|-id=884 bgcolor=#E9E9E9
| 596884 ||  || — || April 20, 2006 || Kitt Peak || Spacewatch ||  || align=right | 1.1 km || 
|-id=885 bgcolor=#E9E9E9
| 596885 ||  || — || April 24, 2006 || Kitt Peak || Spacewatch ||  || align=right | 1.9 km || 
|-id=886 bgcolor=#E9E9E9
| 596886 ||  || — || April 26, 2006 || Anderson Mesa || LONEOS ||  || align=right | 1.2 km || 
|-id=887 bgcolor=#FA8072
| 596887 ||  || — || April 24, 2006 || Mount Lemmon || Mount Lemmon Survey ||  || align=right data-sort-value="0.52" | 520 m || 
|-id=888 bgcolor=#E9E9E9
| 596888 ||  || — || April 25, 2006 || Kitt Peak || Spacewatch ||  || align=right | 1.6 km || 
|-id=889 bgcolor=#E9E9E9
| 596889 ||  || — || November 29, 1999 || Kitt Peak || Spacewatch ||  || align=right | 1.4 km || 
|-id=890 bgcolor=#E9E9E9
| 596890 ||  || — || April 29, 2006 || Kitt Peak || Spacewatch ||  || align=right | 1.4 km || 
|-id=891 bgcolor=#E9E9E9
| 596891 ||  || — || April 29, 2006 || Kitt Peak || Spacewatch ||  || align=right | 2.4 km || 
|-id=892 bgcolor=#fefefe
| 596892 ||  || — || April 30, 2006 || Kitt Peak || Spacewatch ||  || align=right data-sort-value="0.80" | 800 m || 
|-id=893 bgcolor=#d6d6d6
| 596893 ||  || — || April 30, 2006 || Kitt Peak || Spacewatch ||  || align=right | 2.0 km || 
|-id=894 bgcolor=#E9E9E9
| 596894 ||  || — || April 30, 2006 || Kitt Peak || Spacewatch ||  || align=right | 1.6 km || 
|-id=895 bgcolor=#d6d6d6
| 596895 ||  || — || April 30, 2006 || Kitt Peak || Spacewatch ||  || align=right | 3.0 km || 
|-id=896 bgcolor=#E9E9E9
| 596896 ||  || — || April 25, 2006 || Catalina || CSS ||  || align=right | 1.3 km || 
|-id=897 bgcolor=#fefefe
| 596897 ||  || — || April 30, 2006 || Kitt Peak || Spacewatch ||  || align=right data-sort-value="0.70" | 700 m || 
|-id=898 bgcolor=#E9E9E9
| 596898 ||  || — || April 30, 2006 || Kitt Peak || Spacewatch ||  || align=right | 1.4 km || 
|-id=899 bgcolor=#E9E9E9
| 596899 ||  || — || April 30, 2006 || Kitt Peak || Spacewatch ||  || align=right | 1.1 km || 
|-id=900 bgcolor=#E9E9E9
| 596900 ||  || — || April 30, 2006 || Kitt Peak || Spacewatch ||  || align=right | 1.1 km || 
|}

596901–597000 

|-bgcolor=#E9E9E9
| 596901 ||  || — || April 26, 2006 || Cerro Tololo || Cerro Tololo Obs. ||  || align=right | 1.2 km || 
|-id=902 bgcolor=#E9E9E9
| 596902 ||  || — || April 26, 2006 || Cerro Tololo || Cerro Tololo Obs. ||  || align=right | 1.4 km || 
|-id=903 bgcolor=#E9E9E9
| 596903 ||  || — || April 27, 2006 || Cerro Tololo || Cerro Tololo Obs. ||  || align=right data-sort-value="0.87" | 870 m || 
|-id=904 bgcolor=#fefefe
| 596904 ||  || — || April 8, 2013 || Mount Lemmon || Mount Lemmon Survey ||  || align=right data-sort-value="0.62" | 620 m || 
|-id=905 bgcolor=#d6d6d6
| 596905 ||  || — || April 27, 2012 || Haleakala || Pan-STARRS ||  || align=right | 2.0 km || 
|-id=906 bgcolor=#E9E9E9
| 596906 ||  || — || April 21, 2006 || Catalina || CSS ||  || align=right | 1.6 km || 
|-id=907 bgcolor=#E9E9E9
| 596907 ||  || — || March 14, 2010 || Mount Lemmon || Mount Lemmon Survey ||  || align=right | 1.7 km || 
|-id=908 bgcolor=#E9E9E9
| 596908 ||  || — || May 1, 2006 || Wrightwood || J. W. Young ||  || align=right | 1.1 km || 
|-id=909 bgcolor=#E9E9E9
| 596909 ||  || — || February 2, 2006 || Kitt Peak || Spacewatch ||  || align=right | 1.7 km || 
|-id=910 bgcolor=#E9E9E9
| 596910 ||  || — || April 24, 2006 || Kitt Peak || Spacewatch ||  || align=right | 2.0 km || 
|-id=911 bgcolor=#E9E9E9
| 596911 ||  || — || May 5, 2006 || Mount Lemmon || Mount Lemmon Survey ||  || align=right | 1.3 km || 
|-id=912 bgcolor=#fefefe
| 596912 ||  || — || May 3, 2006 || Kitt Peak || Spacewatch ||  || align=right data-sort-value="0.52" | 520 m || 
|-id=913 bgcolor=#E9E9E9
| 596913 ||  || — || April 25, 2006 || Kitt Peak || Spacewatch ||  || align=right | 1.4 km || 
|-id=914 bgcolor=#E9E9E9
| 596914 ||  || — || April 30, 2006 || Kitt Peak || Spacewatch ||  || align=right | 1.8 km || 
|-id=915 bgcolor=#fefefe
| 596915 ||  || — || May 2, 2006 || Mount Lemmon || Mount Lemmon Survey ||  || align=right data-sort-value="0.42" | 420 m || 
|-id=916 bgcolor=#E9E9E9
| 596916 ||  || — || March 26, 2006 || Kitt Peak || Spacewatch ||  || align=right | 1.6 km || 
|-id=917 bgcolor=#E9E9E9
| 596917 ||  || — || May 7, 2006 || Kitt Peak || Spacewatch ||  || align=right | 1.8 km || 
|-id=918 bgcolor=#E9E9E9
| 596918 ||  || — || March 23, 2006 || Kitt Peak || Spacewatch ||  || align=right | 1.6 km || 
|-id=919 bgcolor=#d6d6d6
| 596919 ||  || — || May 9, 2006 || Mount Lemmon || Mount Lemmon Survey ||  || align=right | 1.8 km || 
|-id=920 bgcolor=#d6d6d6
| 596920 ||  || — || May 1, 2006 || Mauna Kea || Mauna Kea Obs. ||  || align=right | 1.7 km || 
|-id=921 bgcolor=#d6d6d6
| 596921 ||  || — || May 1, 2006 || Kitt Peak || Spacewatch || 7:4 || align=right | 3.2 km || 
|-id=922 bgcolor=#fefefe
| 596922 ||  || — || May 1, 2013 || Mount Lemmon || Mount Lemmon Survey ||  || align=right data-sort-value="0.56" | 560 m || 
|-id=923 bgcolor=#E9E9E9
| 596923 ||  || — || May 1, 2006 || Kitt Peak || Spacewatch ||  || align=right | 1.3 km || 
|-id=924 bgcolor=#E9E9E9
| 596924 ||  || — || September 25, 2008 || Mount Lemmon || Mount Lemmon Survey ||  || align=right | 1.7 km || 
|-id=925 bgcolor=#E9E9E9
| 596925 ||  || — || October 16, 2012 || Kitt Peak || Spacewatch ||  || align=right | 1.3 km || 
|-id=926 bgcolor=#E9E9E9
| 596926 ||  || — || May 1, 2006 || Kitt Peak || Spacewatch ||  || align=right data-sort-value="0.97" | 970 m || 
|-id=927 bgcolor=#E9E9E9
| 596927 ||  || — || May 1, 2006 || Kitt Peak || Spacewatch ||  || align=right | 1.6 km || 
|-id=928 bgcolor=#E9E9E9
| 596928 ||  || — || April 24, 2006 || Kitt Peak || Spacewatch ||  || align=right | 2.2 km || 
|-id=929 bgcolor=#E9E9E9
| 596929 ||  || — || May 21, 2006 || Kitt Peak || Spacewatch ||  || align=right | 1.2 km || 
|-id=930 bgcolor=#E9E9E9
| 596930 ||  || — || May 21, 2006 || Kitt Peak || Spacewatch ||  || align=right | 1.7 km || 
|-id=931 bgcolor=#d6d6d6
| 596931 ||  || — || May 20, 2006 || Kitt Peak || Spacewatch ||  || align=right | 1.9 km || 
|-id=932 bgcolor=#E9E9E9
| 596932 ||  || — || May 20, 2006 || Kitt Peak || Spacewatch ||  || align=right | 1.7 km || 
|-id=933 bgcolor=#E9E9E9
| 596933 ||  || — || May 21, 2006 || Kitt Peak || Spacewatch ||  || align=right | 1.5 km || 
|-id=934 bgcolor=#d6d6d6
| 596934 ||  || — || May 21, 2006 || Mount Lemmon || Mount Lemmon Survey ||  || align=right | 2.4 km || 
|-id=935 bgcolor=#E9E9E9
| 596935 ||  || — || May 21, 2006 || Kitt Peak || Spacewatch ||  || align=right | 1.1 km || 
|-id=936 bgcolor=#d6d6d6
| 596936 ||  || — || May 21, 2006 || Kitt Peak || Spacewatch ||  || align=right | 2.0 km || 
|-id=937 bgcolor=#E9E9E9
| 596937 ||  || — || May 23, 2006 || Mount Lemmon || Mount Lemmon Survey ||  || align=right | 1.8 km || 
|-id=938 bgcolor=#fefefe
| 596938 ||  || — || May 20, 2006 || Mount Lemmon || Mount Lemmon Survey ||  || align=right data-sort-value="0.59" | 590 m || 
|-id=939 bgcolor=#fefefe
| 596939 ||  || — || May 22, 2006 || Kitt Peak || Spacewatch ||  || align=right data-sort-value="0.62" | 620 m || 
|-id=940 bgcolor=#E9E9E9
| 596940 ||  || — || May 22, 2006 || Kitt Peak || Spacewatch ||  || align=right | 1.3 km || 
|-id=941 bgcolor=#fefefe
| 596941 ||  || — || May 24, 2006 || Kitt Peak || Spacewatch ||  || align=right data-sort-value="0.54" | 540 m || 
|-id=942 bgcolor=#E9E9E9
| 596942 ||  || — || May 25, 2006 || Mount Lemmon || Mount Lemmon Survey ||  || align=right | 1.5 km || 
|-id=943 bgcolor=#fefefe
| 596943 ||  || — || May 6, 2006 || Mount Lemmon || Mount Lemmon Survey ||  || align=right data-sort-value="0.77" | 770 m || 
|-id=944 bgcolor=#fefefe
| 596944 ||  || — || May 27, 2006 || Kitt Peak || Spacewatch || H || align=right data-sort-value="0.59" | 590 m || 
|-id=945 bgcolor=#E9E9E9
| 596945 ||  || — || May 25, 2006 || Mount Lemmon || Mount Lemmon Survey ||  || align=right | 1.9 km || 
|-id=946 bgcolor=#fefefe
| 596946 ||  || — || May 30, 2006 || Mount Lemmon || Mount Lemmon Survey ||  || align=right data-sort-value="0.61" | 610 m || 
|-id=947 bgcolor=#E9E9E9
| 596947 ||  || — || May 6, 2006 || Kitt Peak || Spacewatch ||  || align=right | 2.2 km || 
|-id=948 bgcolor=#E9E9E9
| 596948 ||  || — || May 29, 2006 || Kitt Peak || Spacewatch ||  || align=right | 1.9 km || 
|-id=949 bgcolor=#E9E9E9
| 596949 ||  || — || May 25, 2006 || Mauna Kea || Mauna Kea Obs. ||  || align=right | 1.7 km || 
|-id=950 bgcolor=#fefefe
| 596950 ||  || — || May 23, 2006 || Mount Lemmon || Mount Lemmon Survey ||  || align=right data-sort-value="0.52" | 520 m || 
|-id=951 bgcolor=#E9E9E9
| 596951 ||  || — || May 25, 2006 || Mauna Kea || Mauna Kea Obs. ||  || align=right data-sort-value="0.99" | 990 m || 
|-id=952 bgcolor=#fefefe
| 596952 ||  || — || May 20, 2006 || Mount Lemmon || Mount Lemmon Survey ||  || align=right data-sort-value="0.60" | 600 m || 
|-id=953 bgcolor=#E9E9E9
| 596953 ||  || — || May 23, 2006 || Kitt Peak || Spacewatch ||  || align=right | 1.4 km || 
|-id=954 bgcolor=#E9E9E9
| 596954 ||  || — || December 11, 2013 || Haleakala || Pan-STARRS ||  || align=right | 1.3 km || 
|-id=955 bgcolor=#E9E9E9
| 596955 ||  || — || May 22, 2006 || Kitt Peak || Spacewatch ||  || align=right | 1.7 km || 
|-id=956 bgcolor=#fefefe
| 596956 ||  || — || January 12, 2016 || Haleakala || Pan-STARRS ||  || align=right data-sort-value="0.84" | 840 m || 
|-id=957 bgcolor=#fefefe
| 596957 ||  || — || January 19, 2012 || Kitt Peak || Spacewatch ||  || align=right data-sort-value="0.55" | 550 m || 
|-id=958 bgcolor=#E9E9E9
| 596958 ||  || — || June 12, 2011 || Mount Lemmon || Mount Lemmon Survey ||  || align=right | 2.5 km || 
|-id=959 bgcolor=#E9E9E9
| 596959 ||  || — || May 21, 2006 || Kitt Peak || Spacewatch ||  || align=right | 1.3 km || 
|-id=960 bgcolor=#fefefe
| 596960 ||  || — || June 4, 2006 || Mount Lemmon || Mount Lemmon Survey ||  || align=right data-sort-value="0.61" | 610 m || 
|-id=961 bgcolor=#fefefe
| 596961 ||  || — || June 3, 2006 || Mount Lemmon || Mount Lemmon Survey ||  || align=right | 1.0 km || 
|-id=962 bgcolor=#E9E9E9
| 596962 ||  || — || April 29, 2006 || Kitt Peak || Spacewatch ||  || align=right | 2.2 km || 
|-id=963 bgcolor=#fefefe
| 596963 ||  || — || May 25, 2009 || Kitt Peak || Spacewatch ||  || align=right data-sort-value="0.63" | 630 m || 
|-id=964 bgcolor=#fefefe
| 596964 ||  || — || May 2, 2006 || Mount Lemmon || Mount Lemmon Survey ||  || align=right data-sort-value="0.67" | 670 m || 
|-id=965 bgcolor=#d6d6d6
| 596965 ||  || — || January 7, 2016 || Haleakala || Pan-STARRS ||  || align=right | 2.9 km || 
|-id=966 bgcolor=#C2FFFF
| 596966 ||  || — || October 27, 2009 || Mount Lemmon || Mount Lemmon Survey || L4 || align=right | 9.2 km || 
|-id=967 bgcolor=#E9E9E9
| 596967 ||  || — || July 9, 2002 || Palomar || NEAT ||  || align=right | 1.7 km || 
|-id=968 bgcolor=#E9E9E9
| 596968 ||  || — || June 22, 2006 || Palomar || NEAT ||  || align=right | 1.7 km || 
|-id=969 bgcolor=#E9E9E9
| 596969 ||  || — || October 21, 2007 || Kitt Peak || Spacewatch ||  || align=right | 1.7 km || 
|-id=970 bgcolor=#E9E9E9
| 596970 ||  || — || November 2, 2007 || Mount Lemmon || Mount Lemmon Survey ||  || align=right | 1.6 km || 
|-id=971 bgcolor=#E9E9E9
| 596971 ||  || — || June 22, 2006 || Kitt Peak || Spacewatch ||  || align=right | 2.2 km || 
|-id=972 bgcolor=#E9E9E9
| 596972 ||  || — || June 22, 2006 || Kitt Peak || Spacewatch ||  || align=right | 1.6 km || 
|-id=973 bgcolor=#d6d6d6
| 596973 ||  || — || January 4, 2003 || Kitt Peak || Spacewatch ||  || align=right | 2.8 km || 
|-id=974 bgcolor=#E9E9E9
| 596974 ||  || — || February 5, 2009 || Kitt Peak || Spacewatch ||  || align=right | 1.7 km || 
|-id=975 bgcolor=#fefefe
| 596975 ||  || — || July 19, 2006 || Mauna Kea || Mauna Kea Obs. ||  || align=right data-sort-value="0.50" | 500 m || 
|-id=976 bgcolor=#C2FFFF
| 596976 ||  || — || July 19, 2006 || Mauna Kea || Mauna Kea Obs. || L4 || align=right | 7.5 km || 
|-id=977 bgcolor=#fefefe
| 596977 ||  || — || July 21, 2006 || Mount Lemmon || Mount Lemmon Survey ||  || align=right data-sort-value="0.79" | 790 m || 
|-id=978 bgcolor=#fefefe
| 596978 ||  || — || March 15, 2012 || Mount Lemmon || Mount Lemmon Survey ||  || align=right data-sort-value="0.56" | 560 m || 
|-id=979 bgcolor=#C2FFFF
| 596979 ||  || — || January 29, 2012 || Kitt Peak || Spacewatch || L4 || align=right | 7.9 km || 
|-id=980 bgcolor=#fefefe
| 596980 ||  || — || August 11, 2006 || Palomar || NEAT ||  || align=right | 1.1 km || 
|-id=981 bgcolor=#fefefe
| 596981 ||  || — || August 12, 2006 || Palomar || NEAT || NYS || align=right data-sort-value="0.50" | 500 m || 
|-id=982 bgcolor=#fefefe
| 596982 ||  || — || August 13, 2006 || Palomar || NEAT ||  || align=right data-sort-value="0.60" | 600 m || 
|-id=983 bgcolor=#E9E9E9
| 596983 ||  || — || August 14, 2006 || Siding Spring || SSS ||  || align=right | 2.4 km || 
|-id=984 bgcolor=#fefefe
| 596984 ||  || — || August 13, 2006 || Palomar || NEAT ||  || align=right data-sort-value="0.65" | 650 m || 
|-id=985 bgcolor=#fefefe
| 596985 ||  || — || August 13, 2006 || Palomar || NEAT ||  || align=right data-sort-value="0.74" | 740 m || 
|-id=986 bgcolor=#E9E9E9
| 596986 ||  || — || August 17, 2006 || Goodricke-Pigott || R. A. Tucker ||  || align=right | 2.3 km || 
|-id=987 bgcolor=#fefefe
| 596987 ||  || — || August 16, 2006 || Siding Spring || SSS ||  || align=right data-sort-value="0.73" | 730 m || 
|-id=988 bgcolor=#fefefe
| 596988 ||  || — || August 12, 2006 || Palomar || NEAT ||  || align=right data-sort-value="0.85" | 850 m || 
|-id=989 bgcolor=#fefefe
| 596989 ||  || — || August 16, 2006 || Siding Spring || SSS || NYS || align=right data-sort-value="0.64" | 640 m || 
|-id=990 bgcolor=#E9E9E9
| 596990 ||  || — || August 25, 2006 || Cordell-Lorenz || Cordell–Lorenz Obs. ||  || align=right | 2.1 km || 
|-id=991 bgcolor=#fefefe
| 596991 ||  || — || August 19, 2006 || Kitt Peak || Spacewatch ||  || align=right data-sort-value="0.54" | 540 m || 
|-id=992 bgcolor=#fefefe
| 596992 ||  || — || August 22, 2006 || Palomar || NEAT ||  || align=right data-sort-value="0.84" | 840 m || 
|-id=993 bgcolor=#fefefe
| 596993 ||  || — || August 15, 2006 || Palomar || NEAT ||  || align=right data-sort-value="0.77" | 770 m || 
|-id=994 bgcolor=#fefefe
| 596994 ||  || — || August 19, 2006 || Anderson Mesa || LONEOS ||  || align=right data-sort-value="0.62" | 620 m || 
|-id=995 bgcolor=#fefefe
| 596995 ||  || — || July 18, 2006 || Siding Spring || SSS ||  || align=right data-sort-value="0.75" | 750 m || 
|-id=996 bgcolor=#E9E9E9
| 596996 Suhantzong ||  ||  || August 27, 2006 || Lulin || H.-C. Lin, Q.-z. Ye ||  || align=right | 3.4 km || 
|-id=997 bgcolor=#E9E9E9
| 596997 ||  || — || August 19, 2006 || Kitt Peak || Spacewatch || DOR || align=right | 1.9 km || 
|-id=998 bgcolor=#fefefe
| 596998 ||  || — || August 21, 2006 || Kitt Peak || Spacewatch ||  || align=right data-sort-value="0.55" | 550 m || 
|-id=999 bgcolor=#fefefe
| 596999 ||  || — || August 21, 2006 || Kitt Peak || Spacewatch ||  || align=right data-sort-value="0.73" | 730 m || 
|-id=000 bgcolor=#E9E9E9
| 597000 ||  || — || August 21, 2006 || Kitt Peak || Spacewatch ||  || align=right | 2.1 km || 
|}

References

External links 
 Discovery Circumstances: Numbered Minor Planets (595001)–(600000) (IAU Minor Planet Center)

0596